= Old Europe (archaeology) =

Term for a hypothetical homogeneous pre-Indo-European culture

- Geographical range: Southeast Europe and adjoining areas of Central Europe and Eastern Europe
- Period: Neolithic, Copper Age, Prehistoric Europe
- Dates: c. 6795—3500 BC
- Preceded by: Mesolithic Europe
- Followed by: Bronze Age Europe

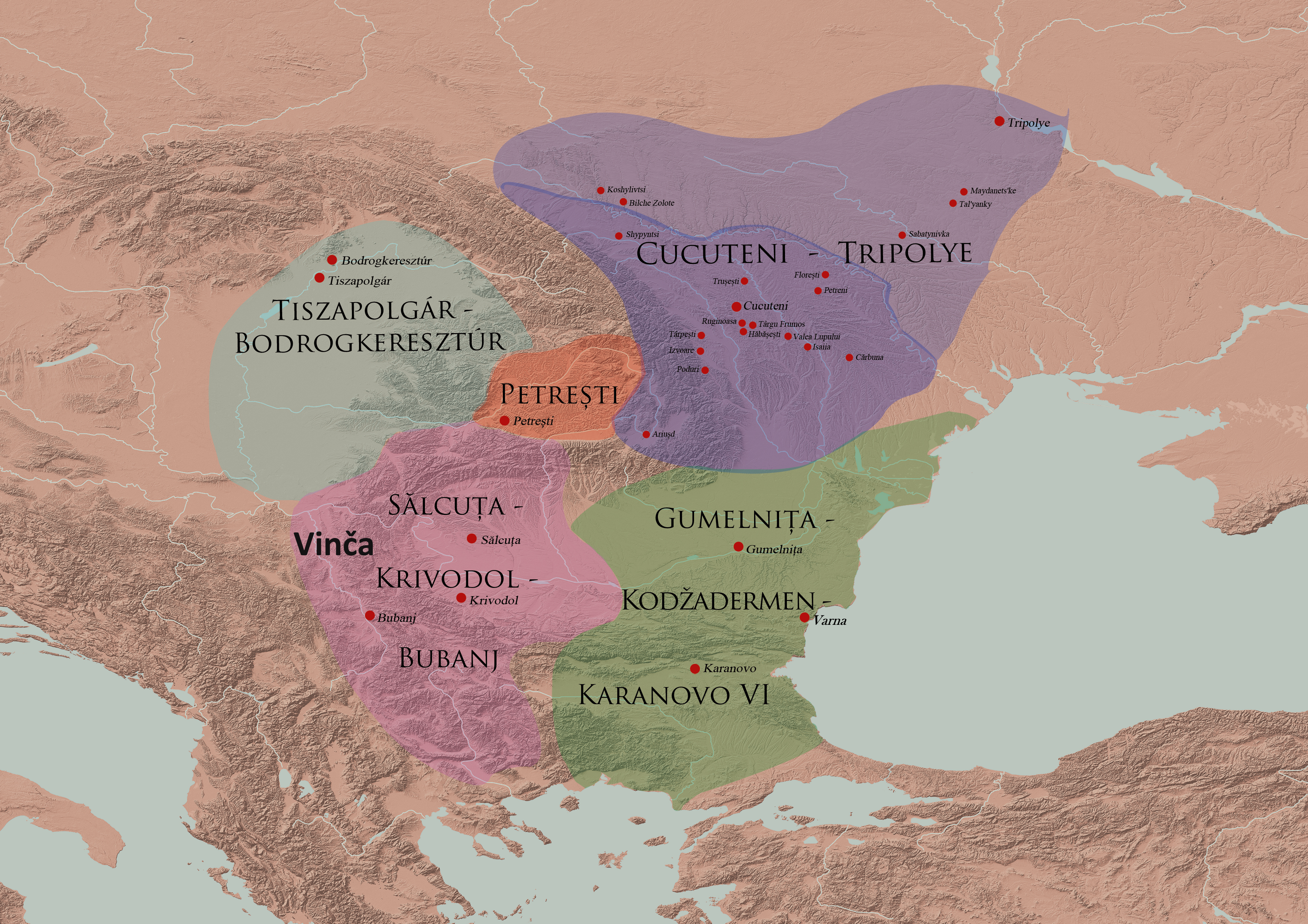
Copper Age cultures in Southeastern Europe

Old Europe, or the Danube civilisation, was a relatively homogeneous pre-Indo-European Neolithic and Copper Age culture or civilisation in Southeast Europe, centred in the Lower Danube Valley. The term was coined by the Lithuanian-American archaeologist Marija Gimbutas.

The term "Danubian culture" was earlier coined by the archaeologist Vere Gordon Childe to describe early farming cultures (e.g. the Linear Pottery culture) which spread westwards and northwards from the Danube Valley into Central and Eastern Europe.

== Description ==
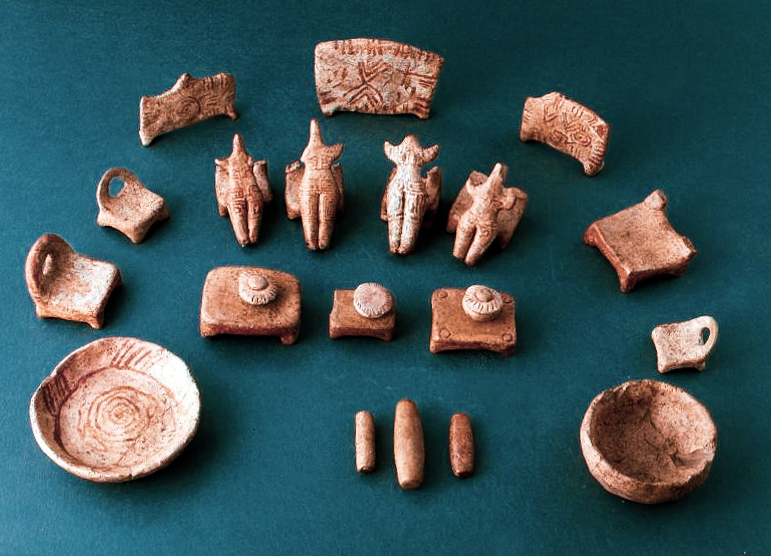
Miniature cult scene, Karanovo culture, 5th millennium BC

In 4500 bc, before the first cities were built in Mesopotamia and Egypt, Old Europe was among the most sophisticated and technologically advanced places in the world ... At its peak, about 5000–3500 bc, Old Europe was developing many of the political, technological, and ideological signs of "civilization". Some Old European villages grew to citylike sizes, larger than the earliest cities of Mesopotamia. Some Old European chiefs wore stunning costumes gleaming with gold, copper, and shell ornaments ... Old European metalsmiths were, in their day, among the most advanced metal artisans in the world, and certainly the most active. The metal artifacts recovered by archaeologists from Old Europe total about 4,700 kilograms (more than five tons) of copper, and over 6 kilograms (13.2 pounds) of gold, more metal by far than has been found in any other part of the ancient world dated before 3500 bc. The demand for copper, gold, Aegean shells, and other valuables created networks of negotiation that reached hundreds of kilometers. Pottery, figurines, and even houses were decorated with striking designs. Female "goddess" figurines, found in almost every settlement, have triggered intense debates about the ritual and political power of women. Signs inscribed on clay suggest a system of primitive notation, if not writing.

— Anthony (2010)

Neolithic Europe refers to the time between the Mesolithic and Bronze Age periods in Europe, roughly from 7000 BC (the approximate time of the first metal processing societies in Bosnia and Serbia, and first farming societies in Greece), to c. 2000 BC (the beginning of the Bronze Age in Scandinavia). Its peak period is estimated as 5000–3500 BC, during which its population centers exceeded the first Mesopotamian cities. A high level of craft skill and trade is evident from tons of recovered copper artifacts and a small amount of gold, as well as pottery and carved items. These include the period's signature female figurines which have raised interest in the role of the society's women, as well as suspected proto-writing.

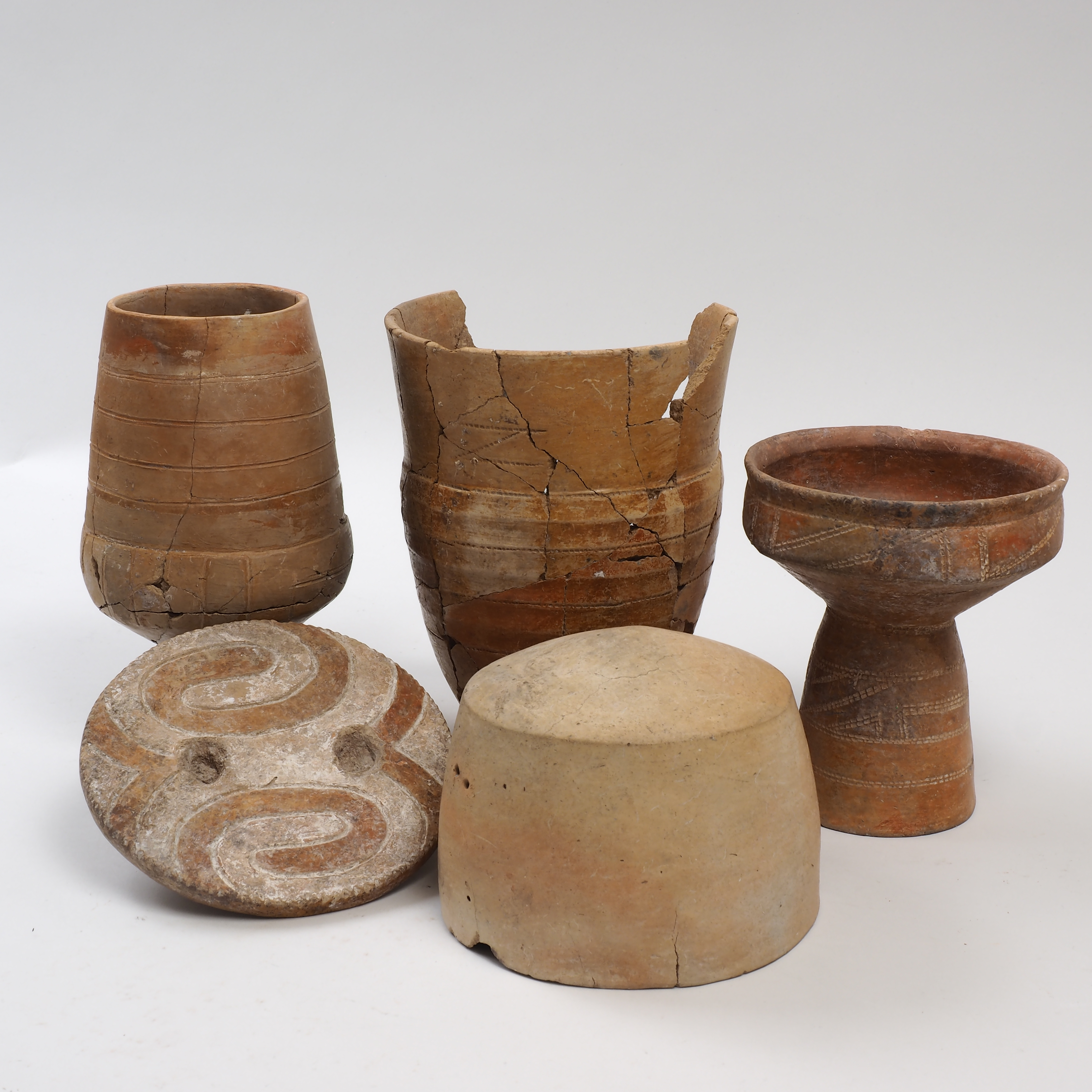
Hamangia culture pottery, c. 4500 BC

Regardless of specific chronology, many European Neolithic groups share basic characteristics, such as living in small-scale communities, being more egalitarian than the city-states and chiefdoms of the Bronze Age, subsisting on domestic plants and animals supplemented with the collection of wild plant foods and hunting, and producing hand-made pottery, without the aid of the potter's wheel. There are also many differences, with some Neolithic communities in southeastern Europe living in heavily fortified settlements of 3,000–4,000 people (e.g., Sesklo in Greece) whereas Neolithic groups in Britain were usually small (possibly 50–100 people).

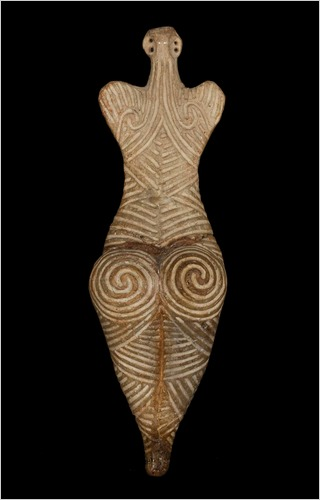
Cucuteni–Trypillia figurine, Romania, 4050–3900 BC

Marija Gimbutas studied the Neolithic period in order to understand cultural developments in settled village culture in the southern Balkans, which she characterized as peaceful, matristic, and possessing a goddess-centered religion. In contrast, she characterizes the later Indo-European influences as warlike, nomadic, and patrilineal. Using evidence from pottery and sculpture, and combining the tools of archaeology, comparative mythology, linguistics, and, most controversially, folkloristics, Gimbutas invented a new interdisciplinary field, archaeomythology.

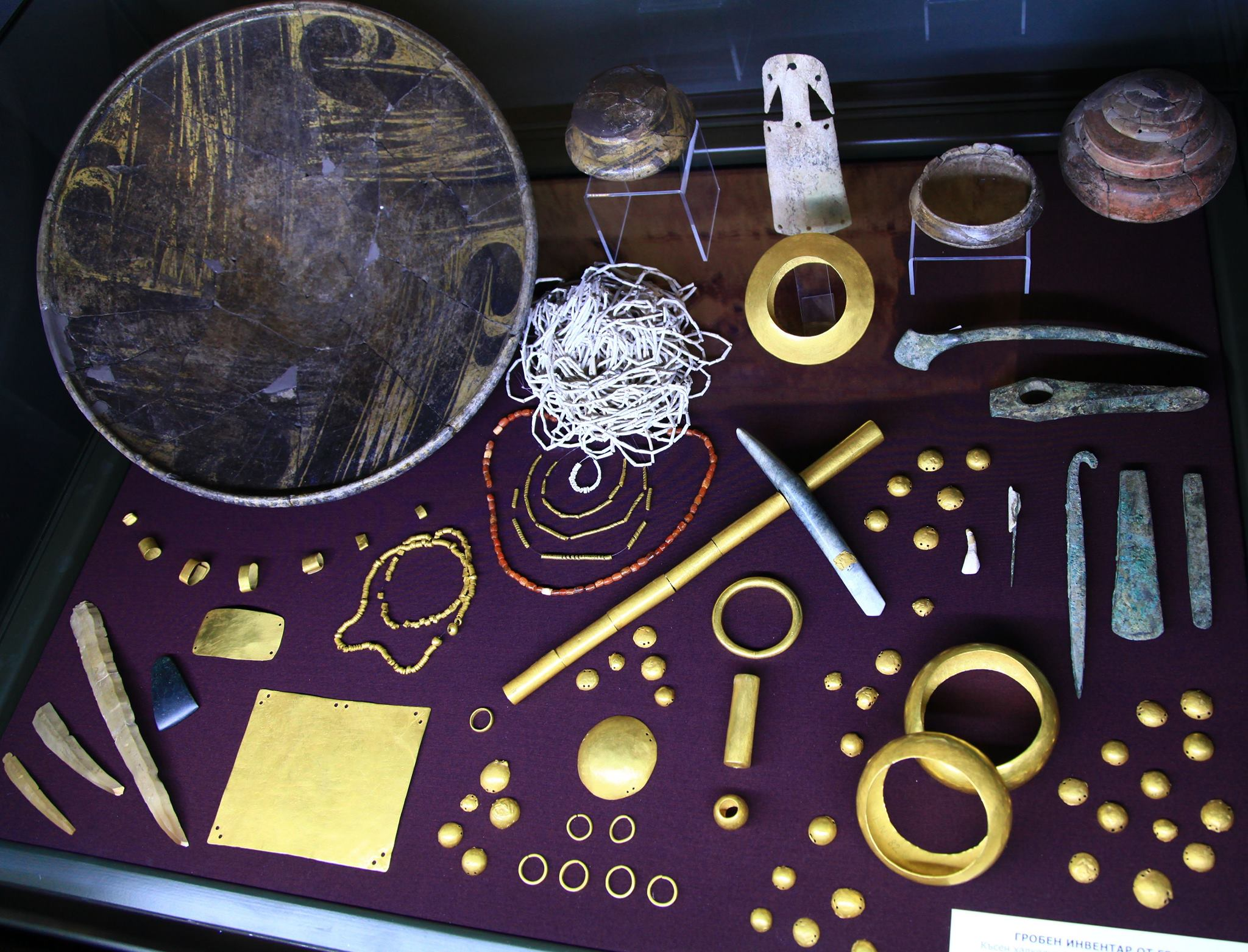
Gold, copper, ceramic and stone artefacts, Varna culture, Bulgaria, c. 4500 BC

In historical times, some ethnonyms are believed to correspond to Pre-Indo-European peoples, assumed to be the descendants of the earlier Old European cultures: the Pelasgians, Minoans, Leleges, Iberians, Nuragic people, Etruscans, Rhaetians, Camunni and Basques. Two of the three pre-Greek peoples of Sicily, the Sicans and the Elymians, may also have been pre-Indo-European.

How many Pre-Indo-European languages existed is not known. Nor is it known whether the ancient names of peoples descended from the pre-ancient population actually referred to speakers of distinct languages. Gimbutas (1989), observing a unity of symbols marked especially on pots, but also on other objects, concluded that there may have been a single language spoken in Old Europe. She thought that decipherment would have to wait for the discovery of bilingual texts.

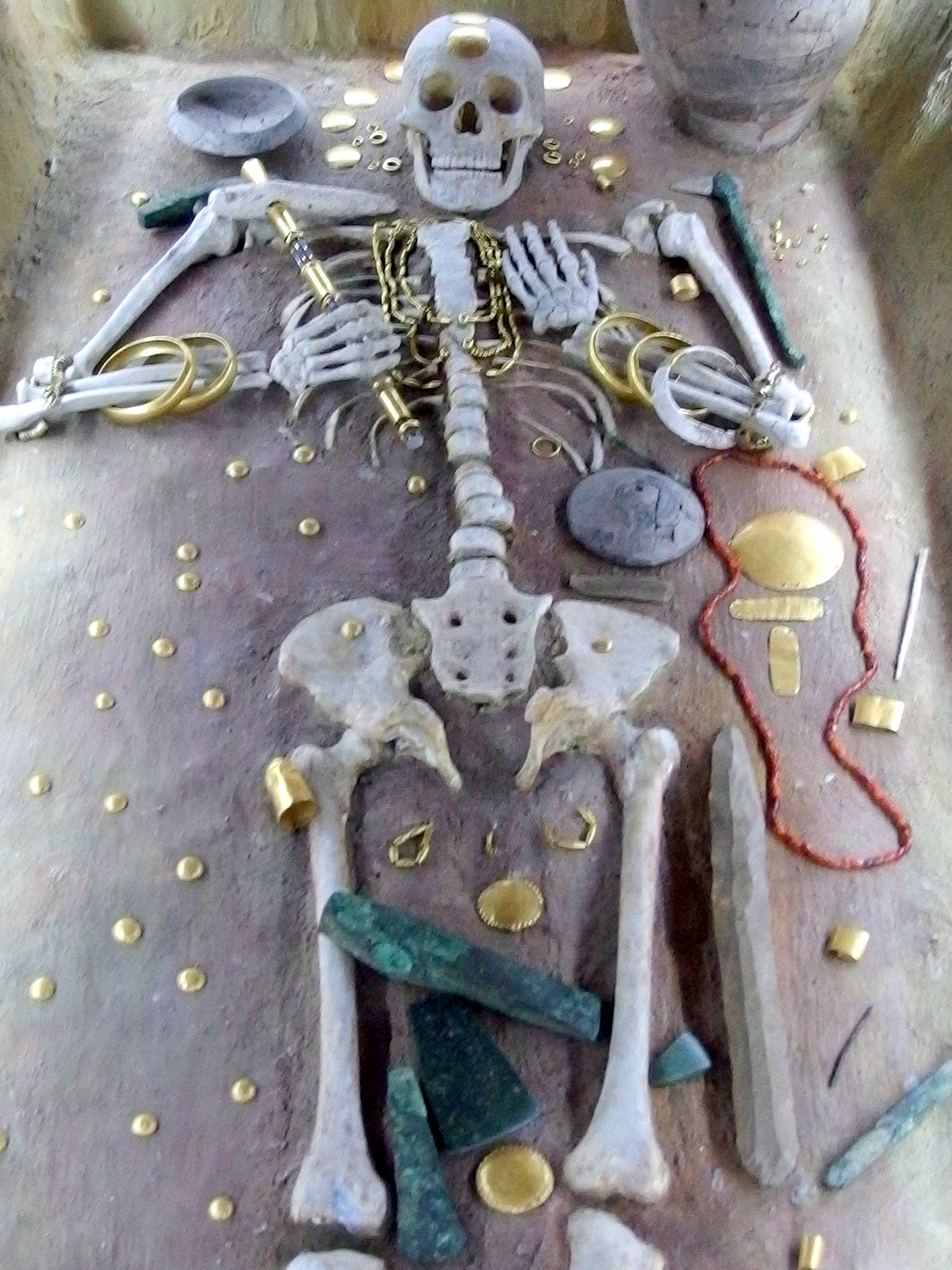
Reconstruction of an elite grave, Varna culture, c. 4500 BC

The idea of a Pre-Indo-European language in the region precedes Gimbutas. It went by other names, such as "Pelasgian", "Mediterranean", or "Aegean". Apart from marks on artifacts, the main evidence concerning Pre-Indo-European language is in names: toponyms, ethnonyms, etc., and in roots in other languages believed to be derived from one or more prior languages, possibly unrelated. Reconstruction from the evidence is an accepted, though somewhat speculative, field of study. Suggestions of possible Old European languages include Urbian by Sorin Paliga, and the Vasconic substratum hypothesis of Theo Vennemann (also see Sigmund Feist's Germanic substrate hypothesis).

== Indo-European origins ==
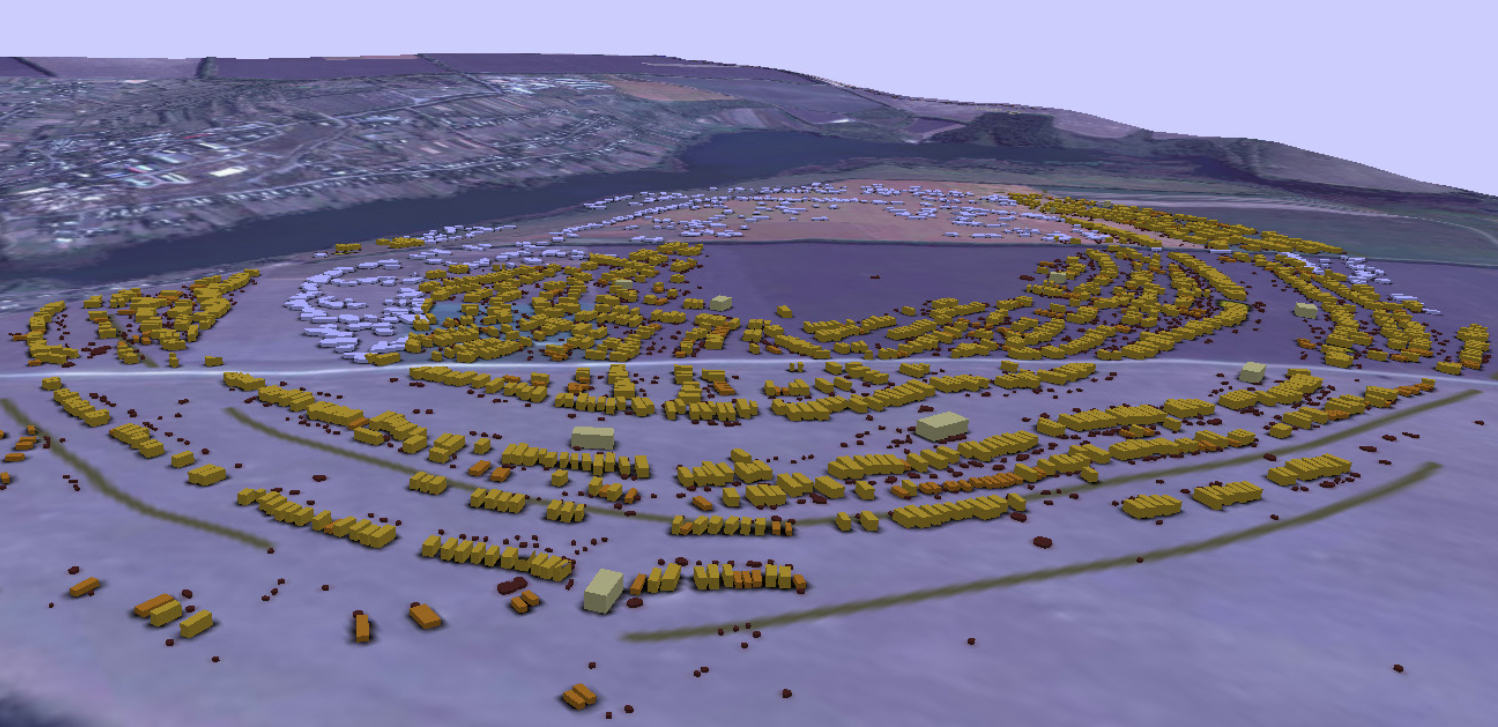
Maidanetske, Ukraine, c. 3700 BC. Cucuteni–Trypillia culture.

According to Gimbutas' version of the Kurgan hypothesis, Old Europe was invaded and destroyed by horse-riding pastoral nomads from the Pontic–Caspian steppe (the "Kurgan culture") who brought with them violence, patriarchy, and Indo-European languages. More recent proponents of the Kurgan hypothesis agree that the cultures of Old Europe spoke pre-Indo-European languages but include a less dramatic transition, with a prolonged migration of Proto-Indo-European speakers after Old Europe's collapse due to other factors.

Colin Renfrew's competing Anatolian hypothesis suggests that the Indo-European languages were spread across Europe by the first farmers from Anatolia. In the hypothesis' original formulation, the languages of Old Europe belonged to the Indo-European family but played no special role in its transmission. According to Renfrew's most recent revision of the theory, however, Old Europe was a "secondary urheimat" (linguistic homeland) where the Greek, Armenian, and Balto-Slavic language families diverged around 5000 BC. Three genetic studies in 2015 gave partial support to the Steppe theory regarding the Indo-European Urheimat. According to those studies, haplogroups R1b and R1a, now the most common in Europe (R1a is also common in South Asia) would have expanded from the steppes north of the Pontic and Caspian seas, along with at least some of the Indo-European languages; they also detected an autosomal component present in modern Europeans which was not present in Neolithic Europeans, which would have been introduced with paternal lineages R1b and R1a, as well as Indo-European languages.

== Cultures ==
The archaeological cultures comprising Old Europe include the following:

- Sesklo culture
- Dimini culture
- Vinča culture
- Karanovo culture
- Gumelnița culture
- Hamangia culture
- Varna culture
- Boian culture
- Butmir culture
- Tisza culture
- Linear Pottery culture
- Lengyel culture
- Cucuteni-Trypillia culture
- Danilo culture
- Tiszapolgár culture
- Bodrogkeresztúr culture
- Petresti culture
- Vădastra culture
- Starčevo–Körös–Criș culture
- Sopot culture
- Cardial culture
- Sălcuţa-Krivodol-Bubanj culture

== Gallery ==
=== Artifacts ===
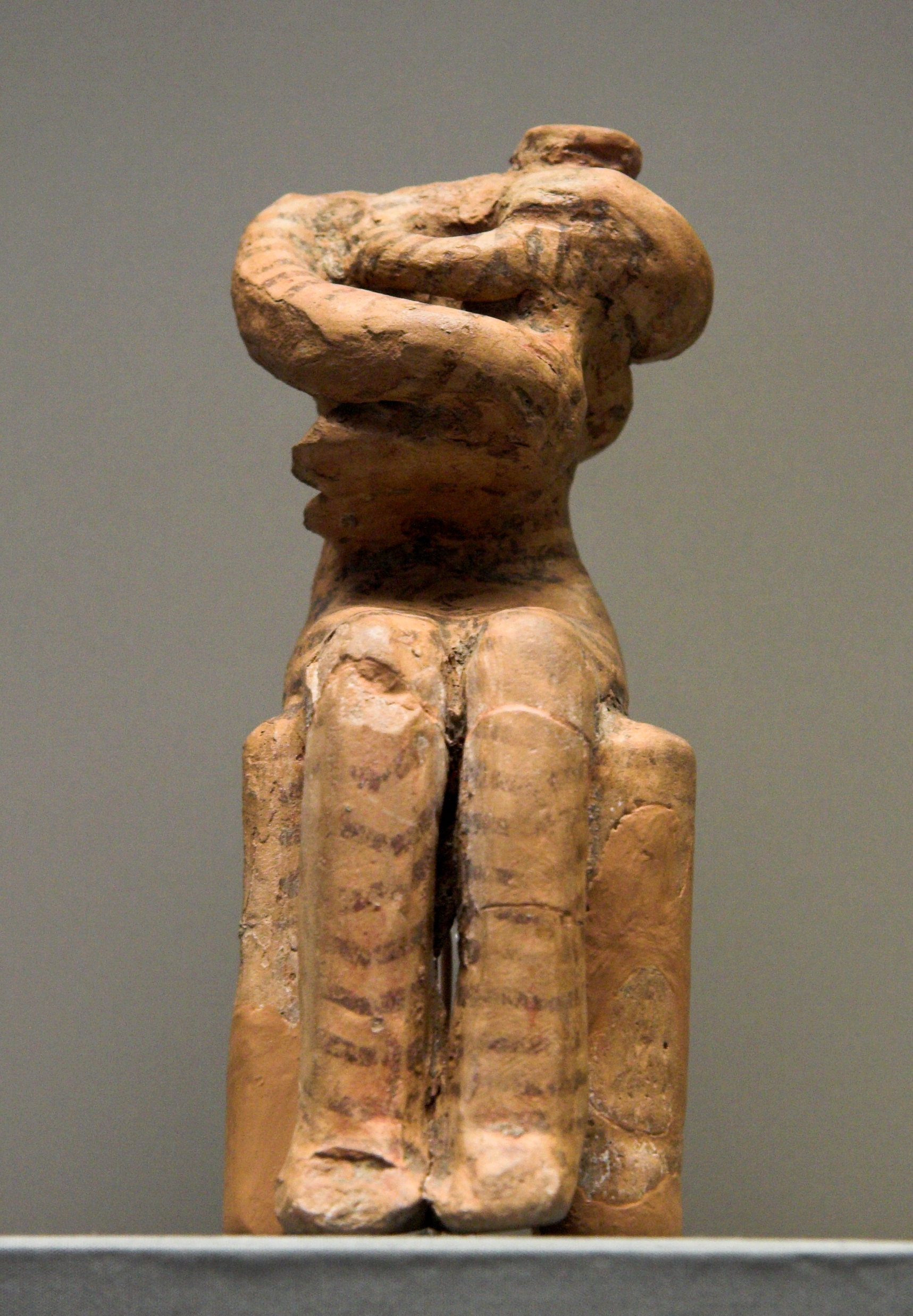
Sesklo culture figurine c. 4800 BC

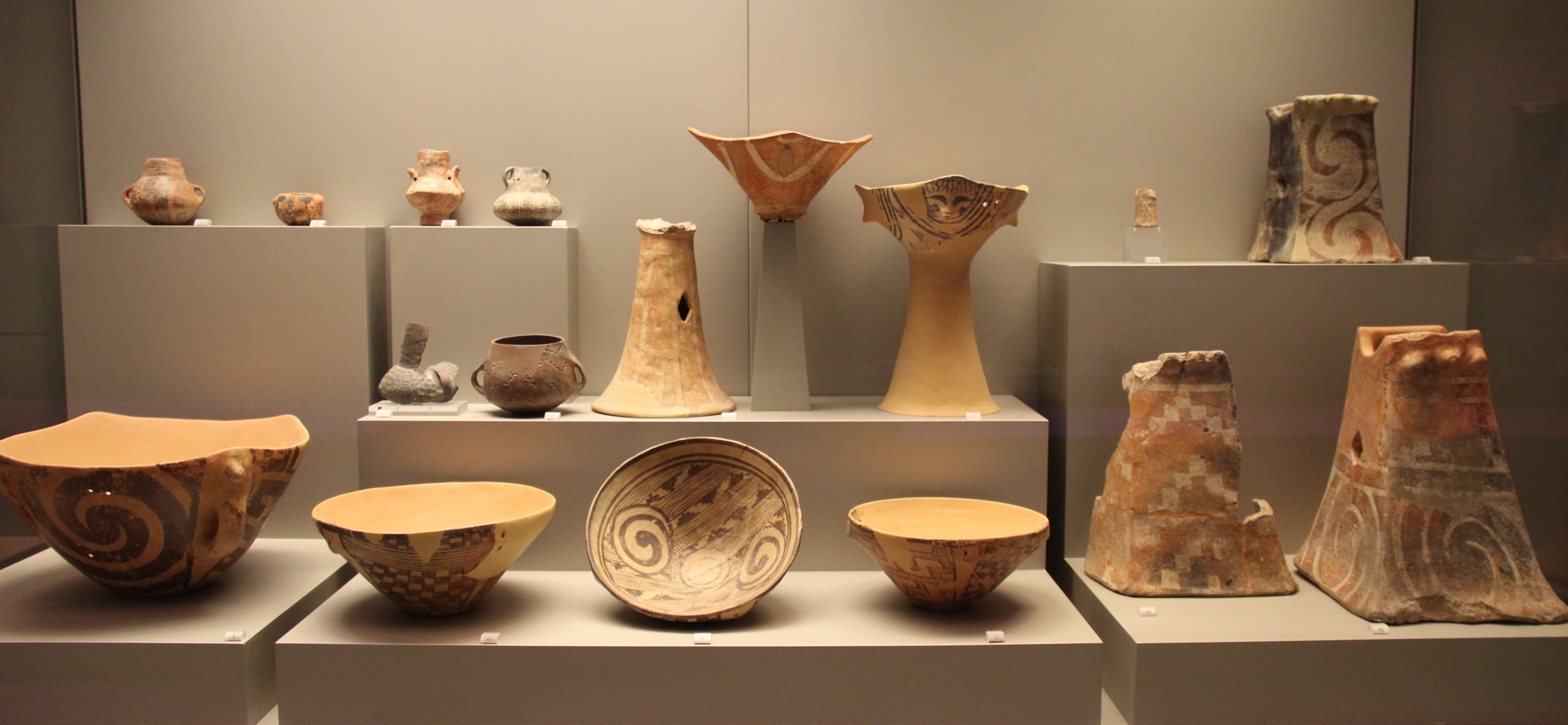
Sesklo and Dimini culture ceramics

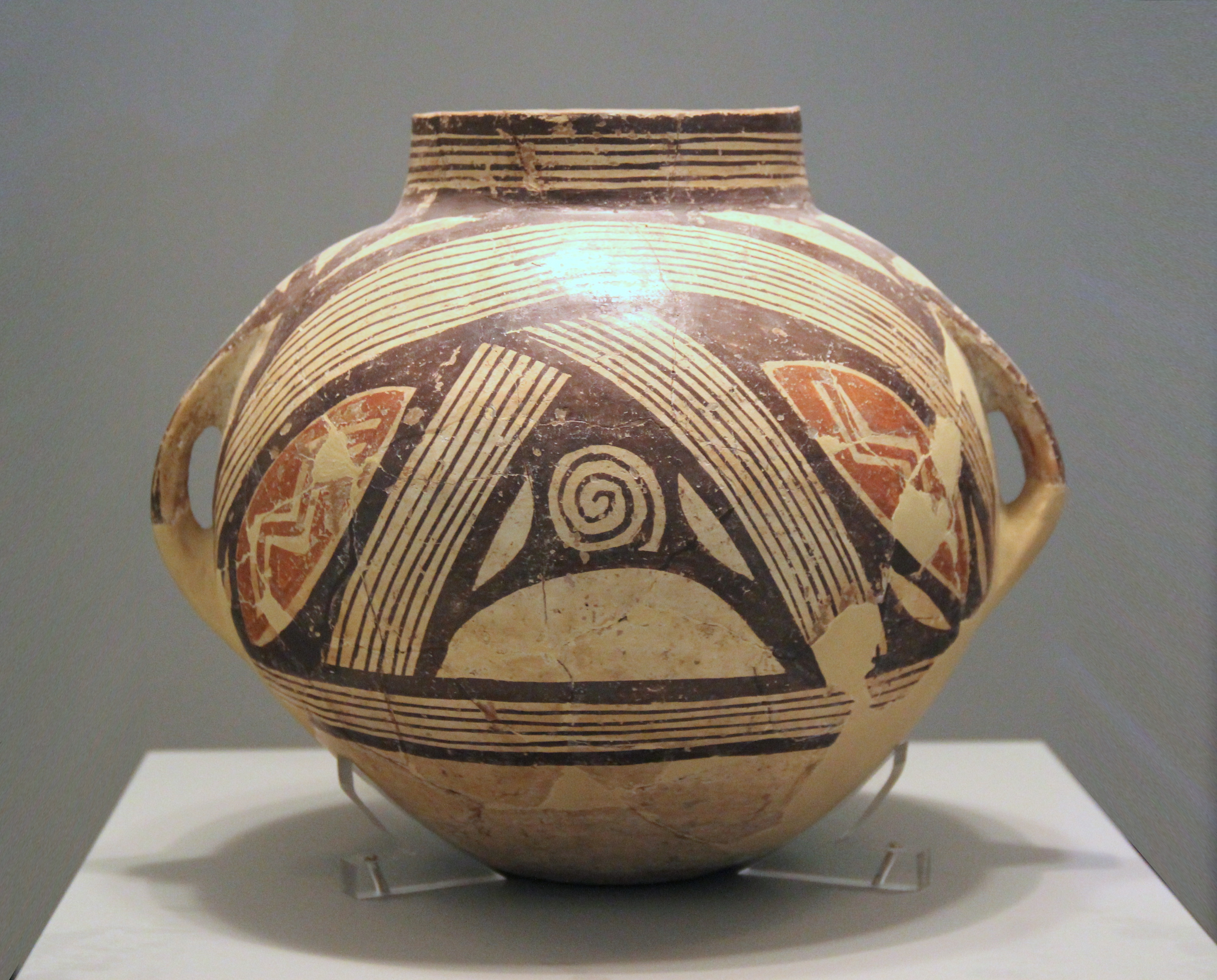
Dimini culture ceramic vessel

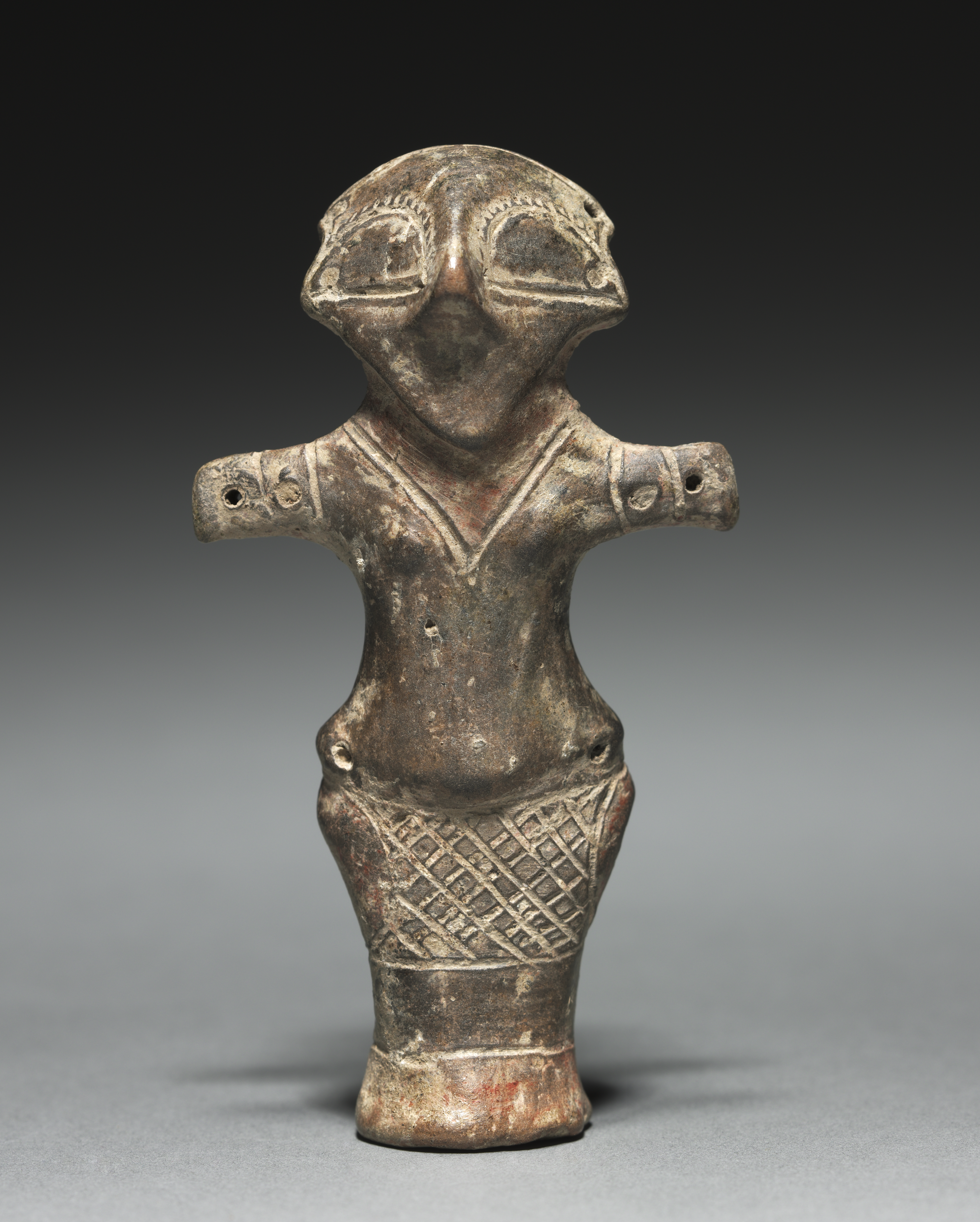
Vinča culture figurine, c. 5000 BC

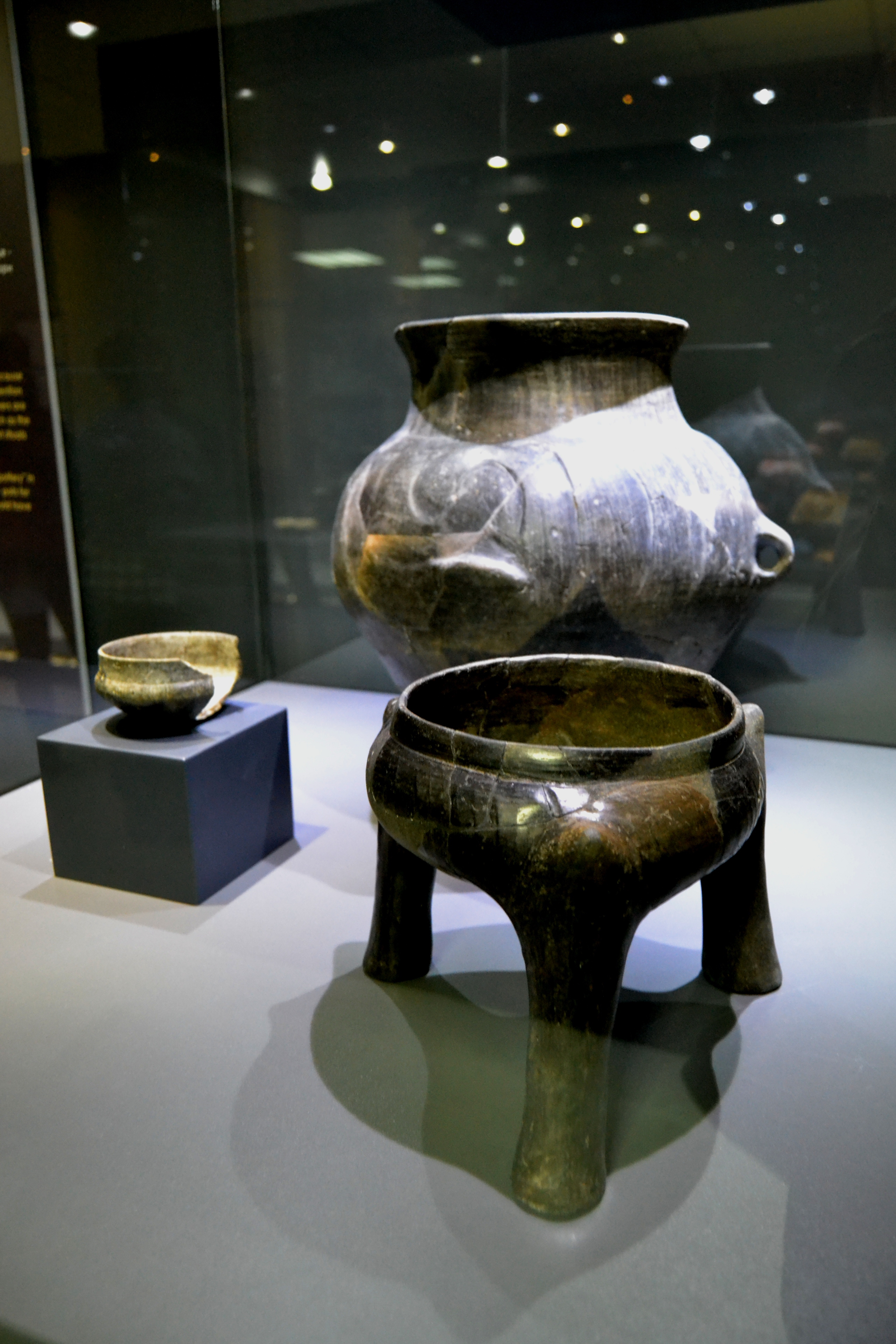
Vinča culture ceramics

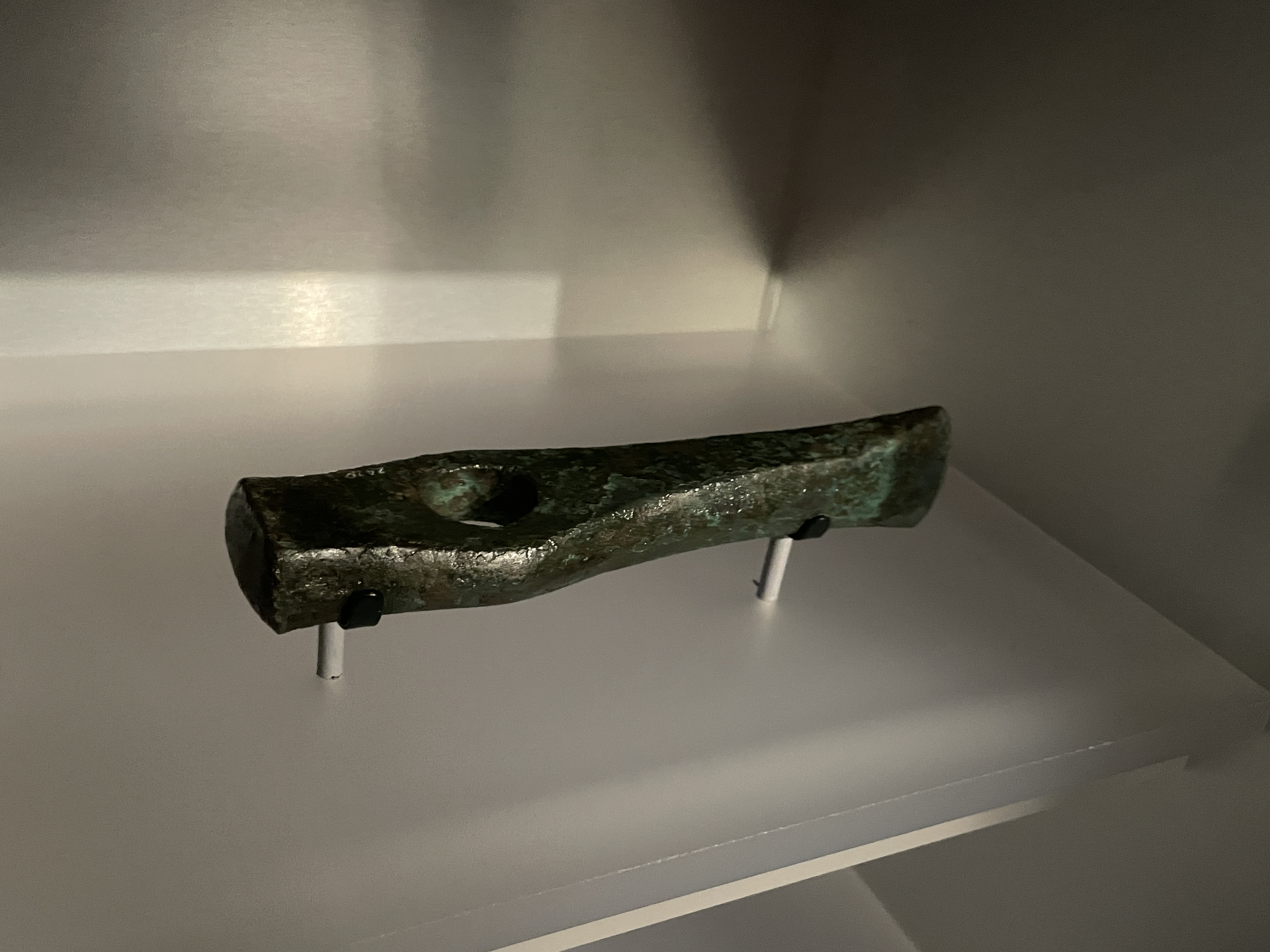
Vinča culture copper axe

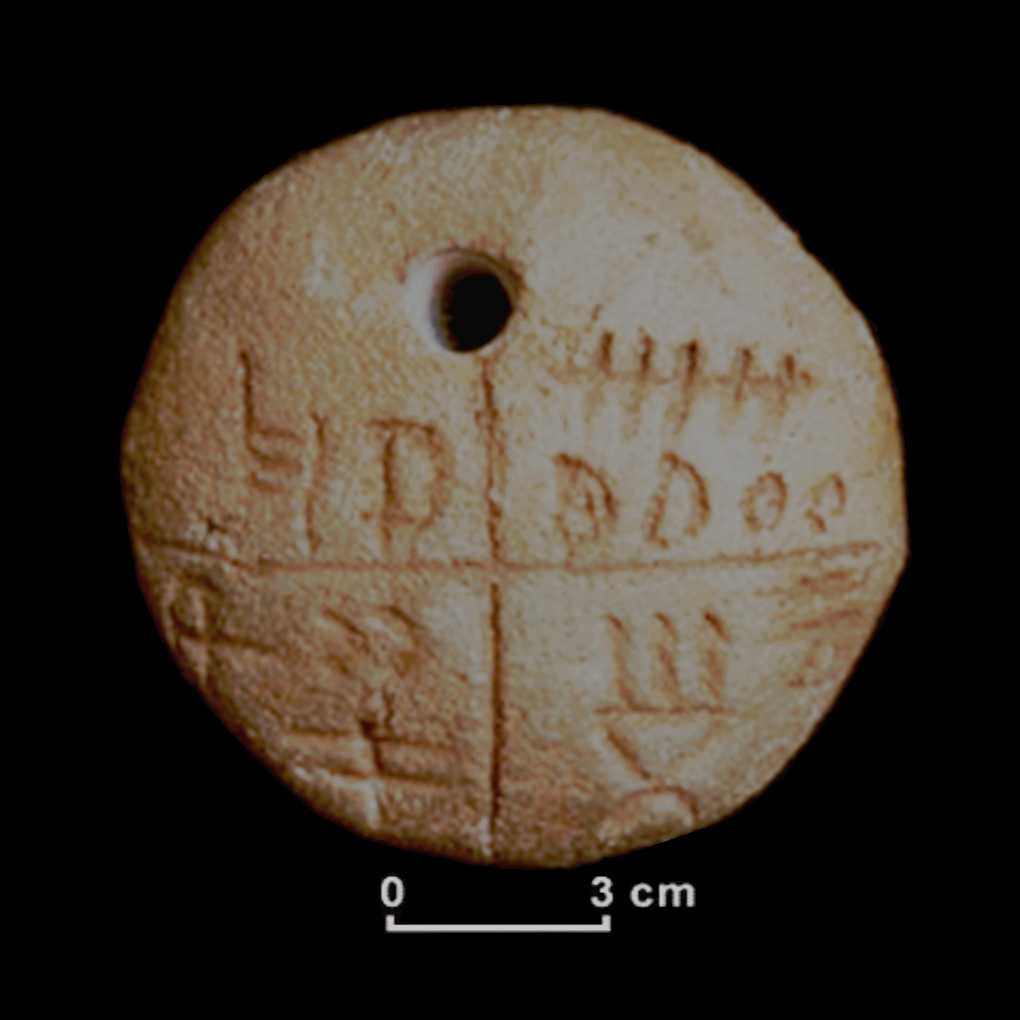
Vinča culture, Tartaria tablet

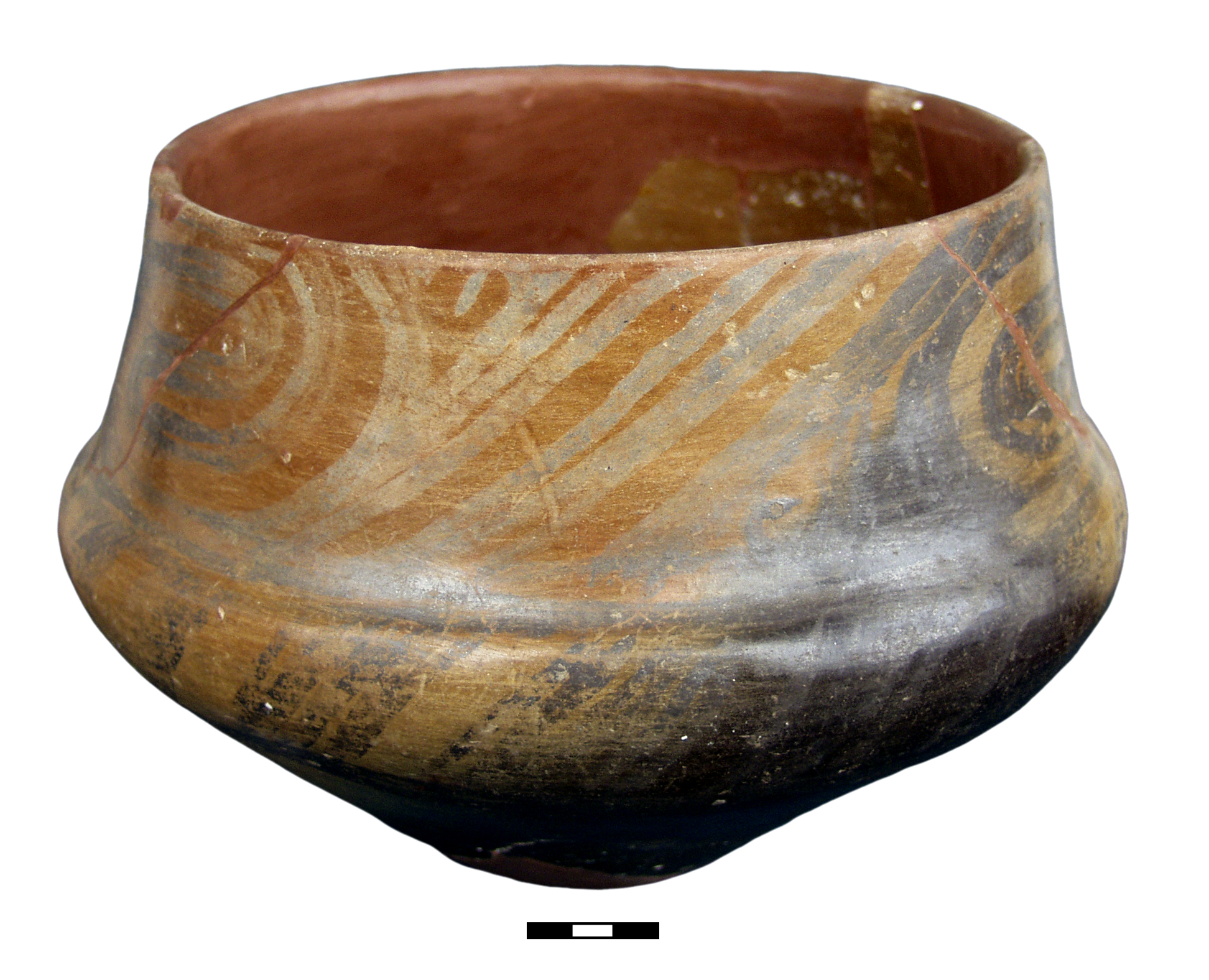
Karanovo culture ceramic vessel

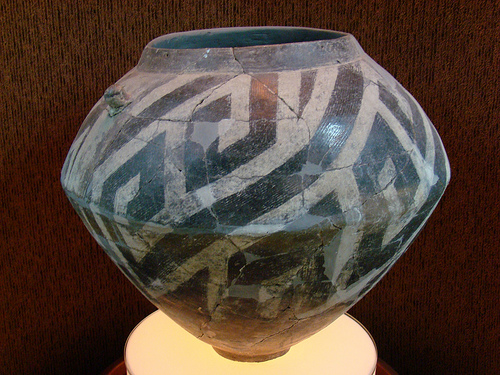
Karanovo culture ceramic vessel

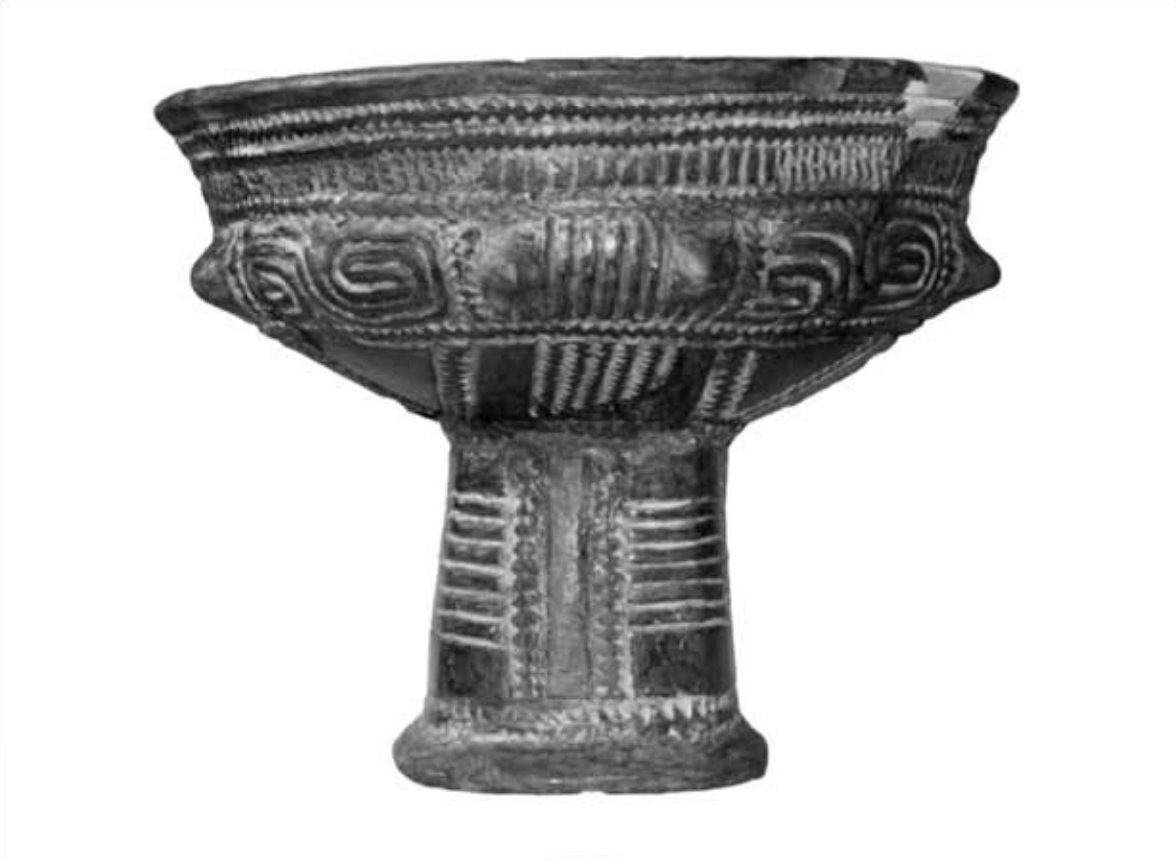
Vădastra culture pedestalled bowl

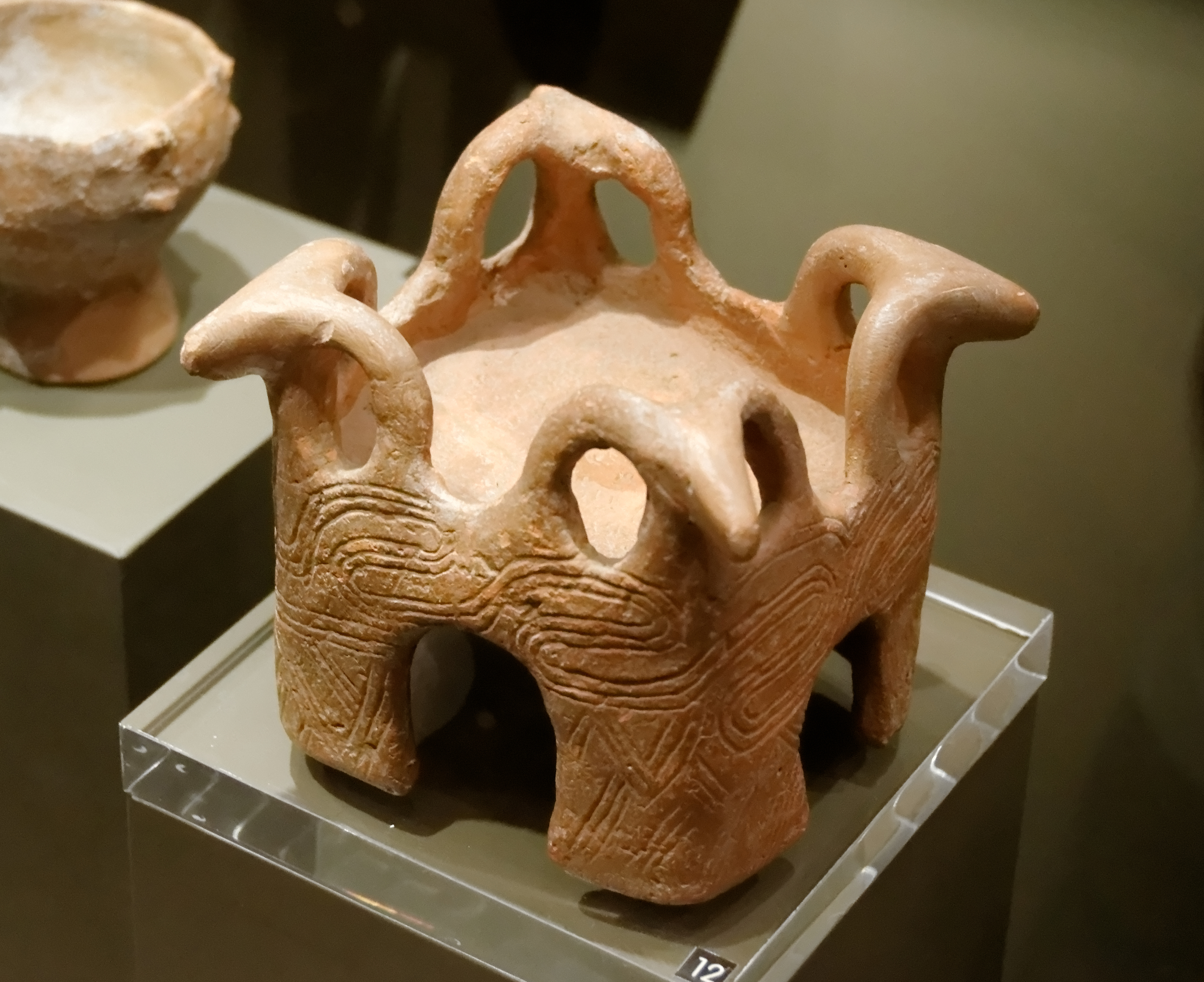
Tisza culture ceramic altar, c. 5300 BC

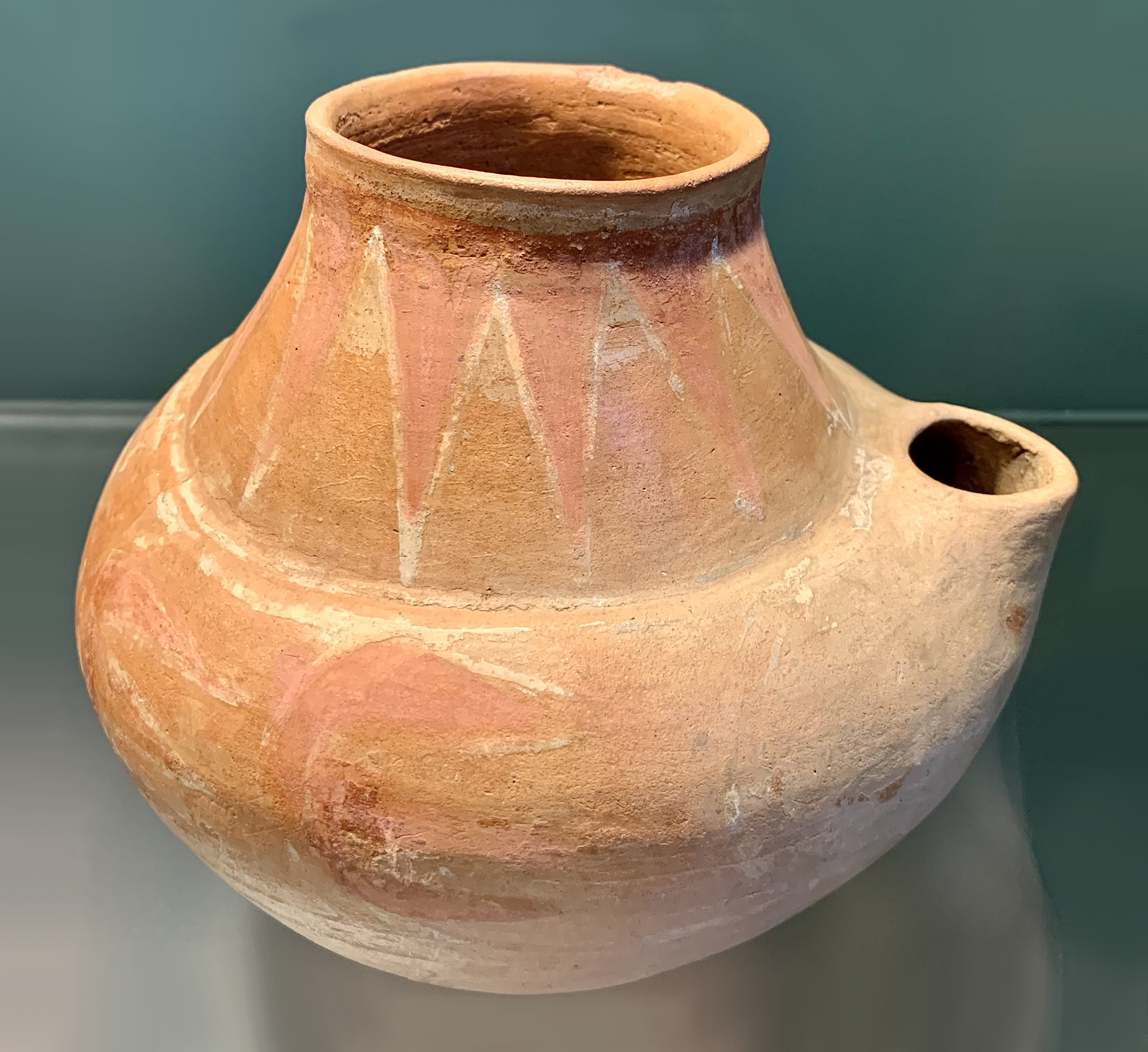
Gumelnița culture ceramic vessel

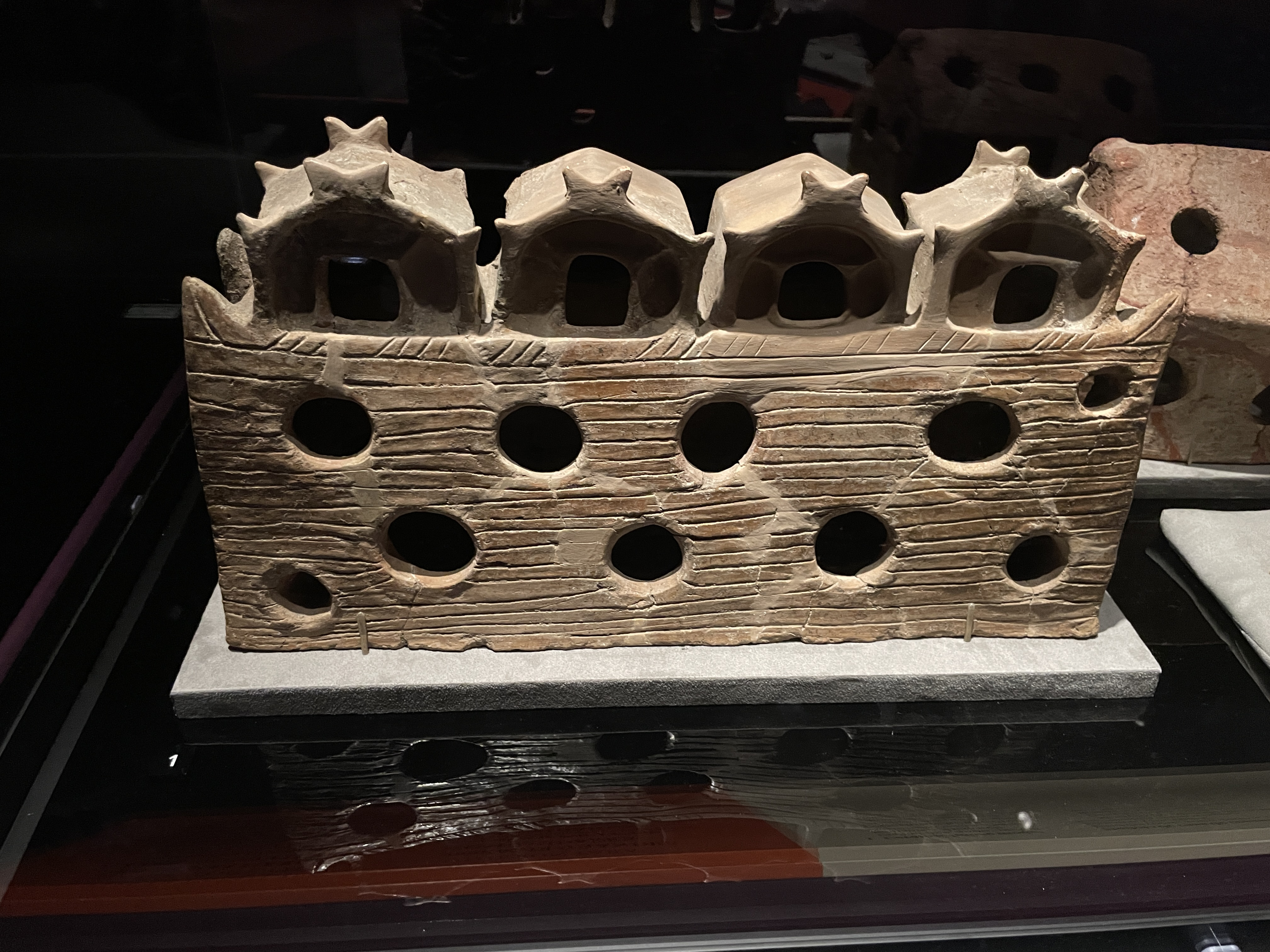
Gumelnița culture architectural model

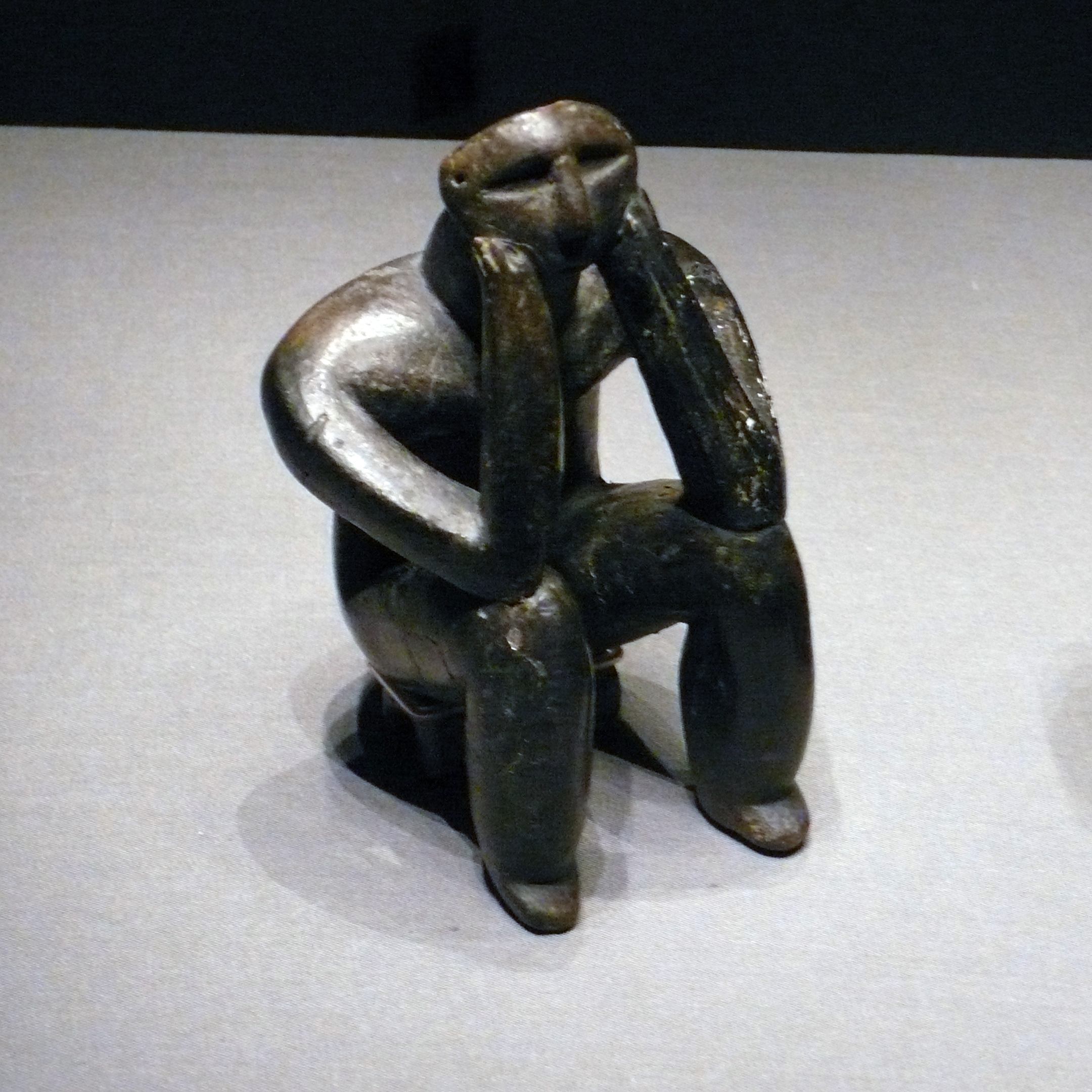
Hamangia culture figurine

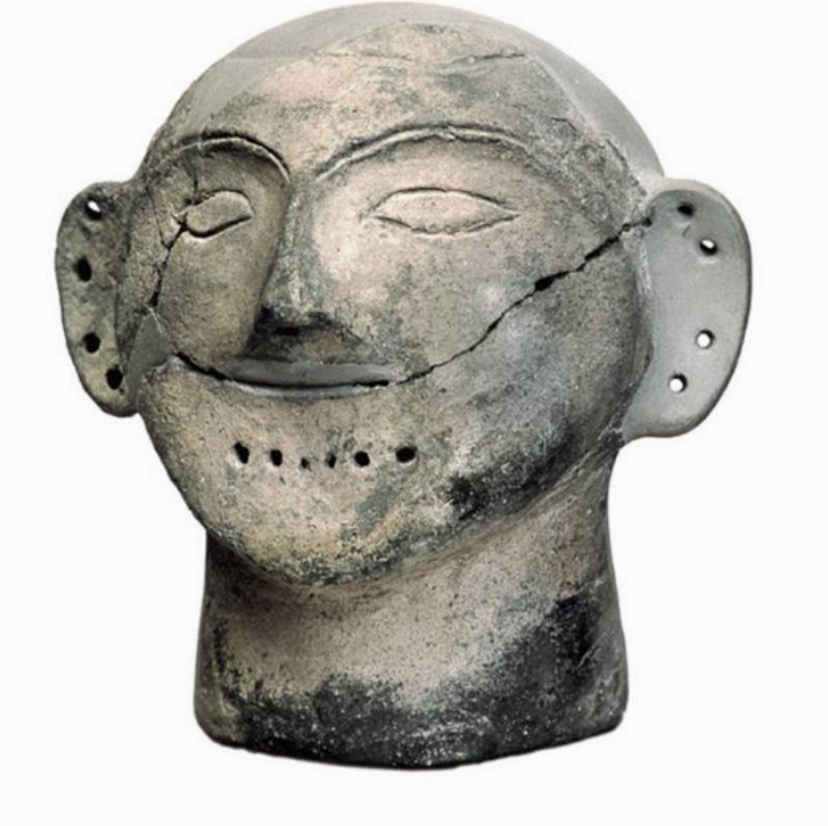
Hamangia culture ceramic sculpture

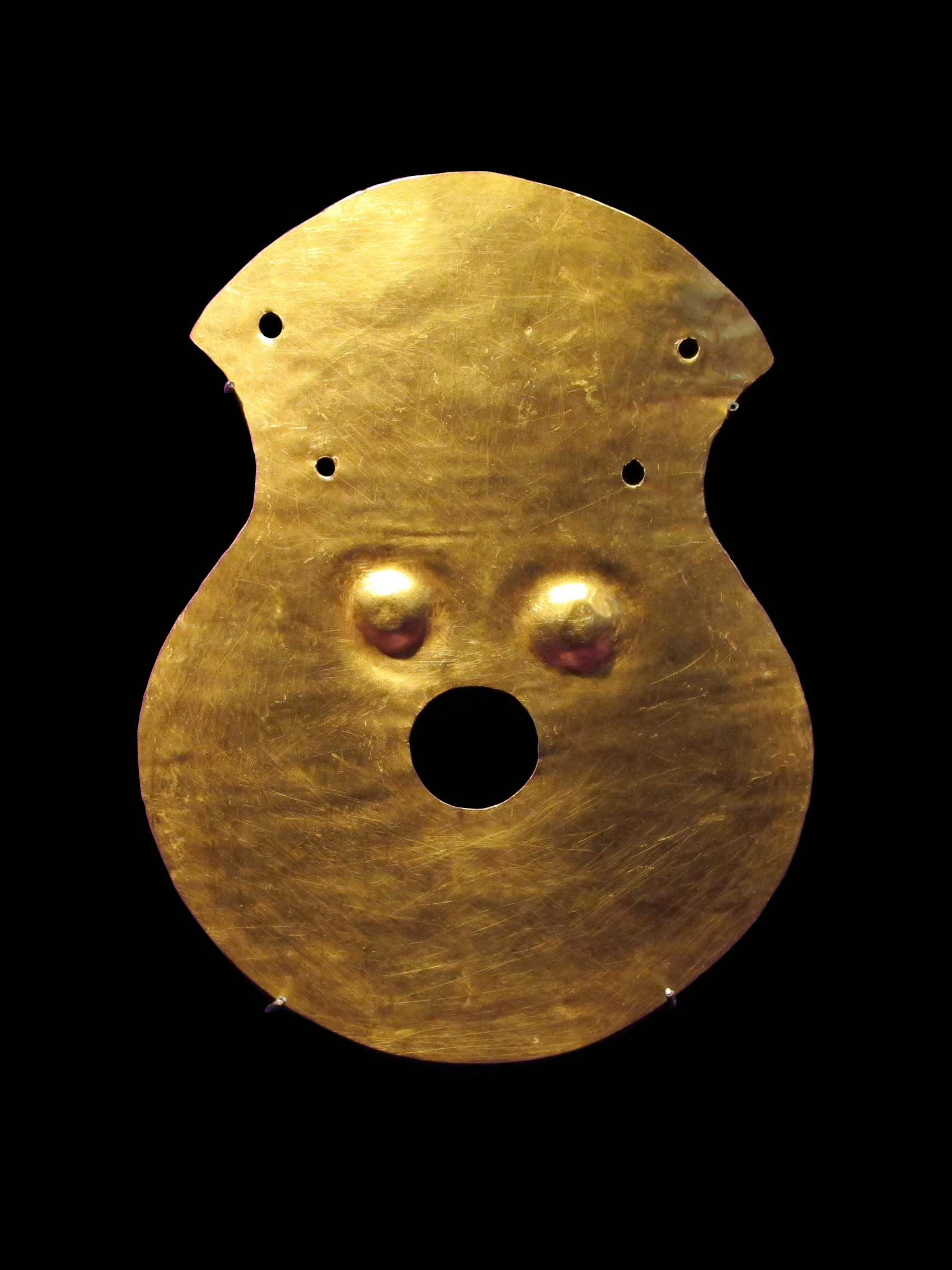
Bodrogkeresztúr culture gold idol

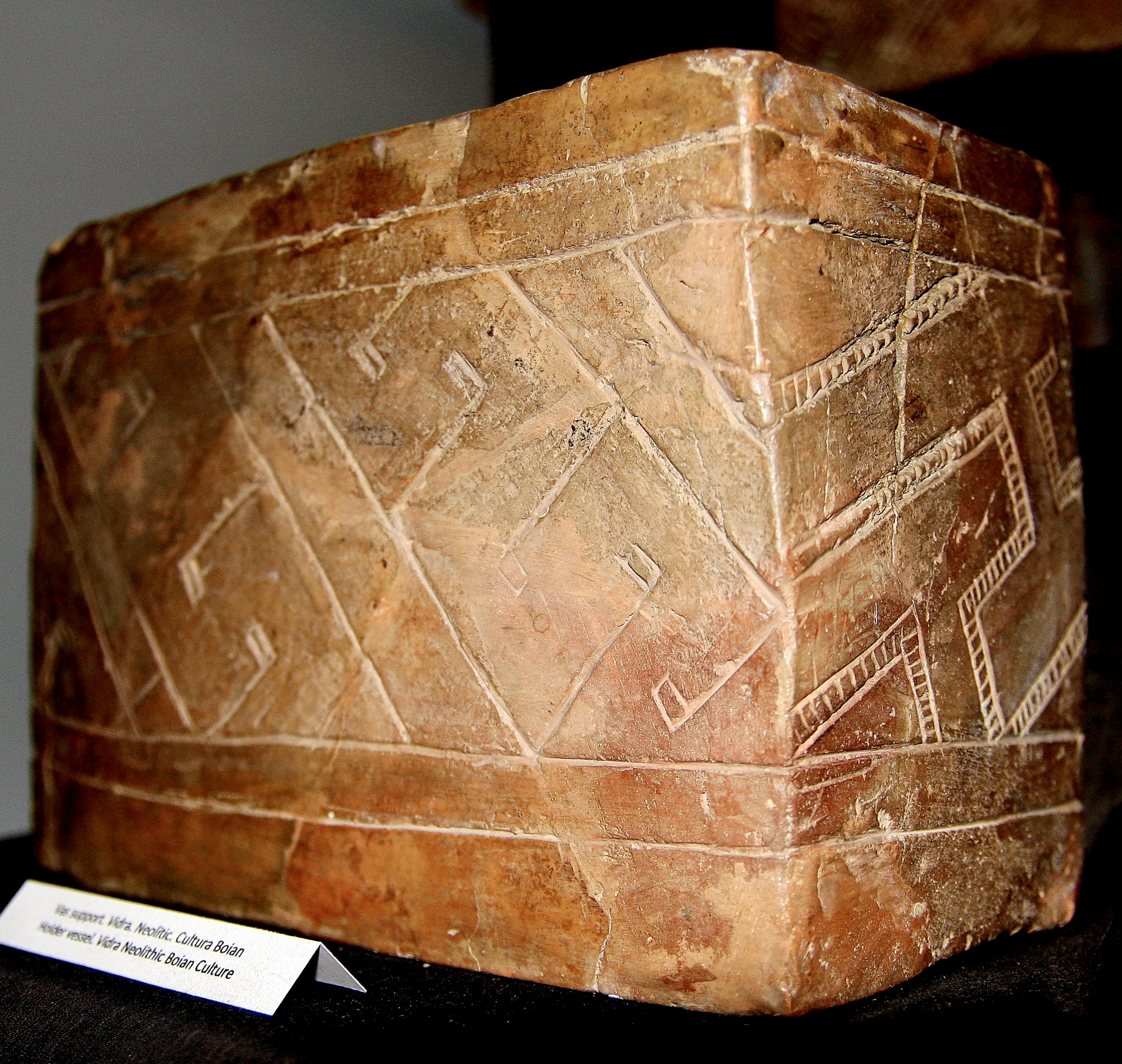
Boian culture ceramic

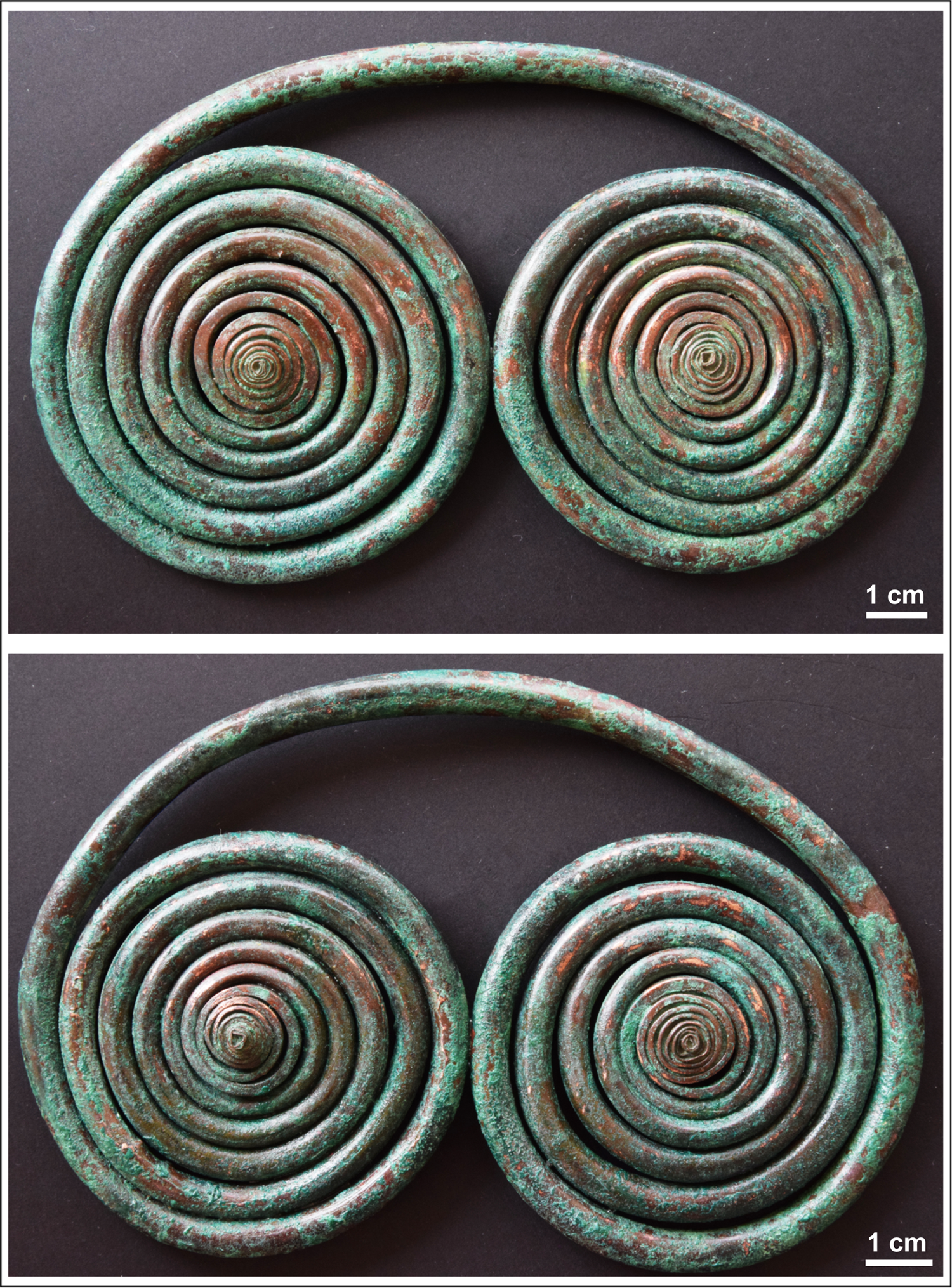
Tiszapolgár culture, copper ornaments

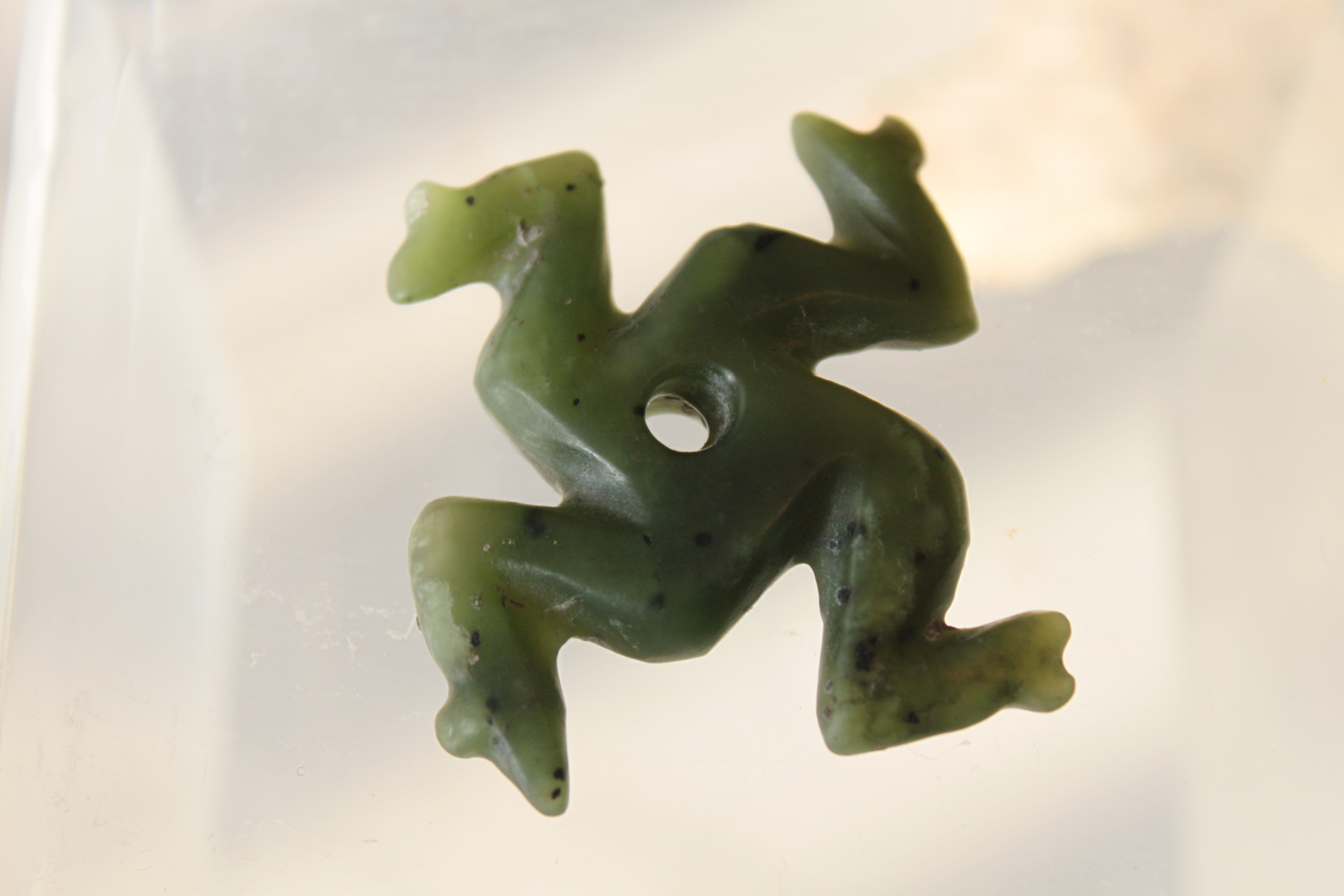
Jade pendant, Karanovo culture

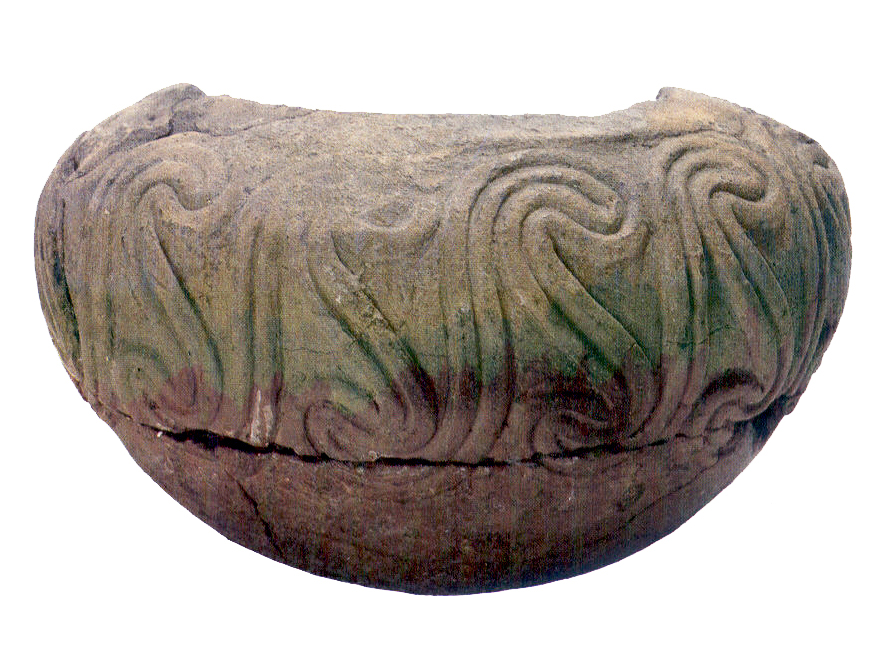
Butmir culture ceramic vessel

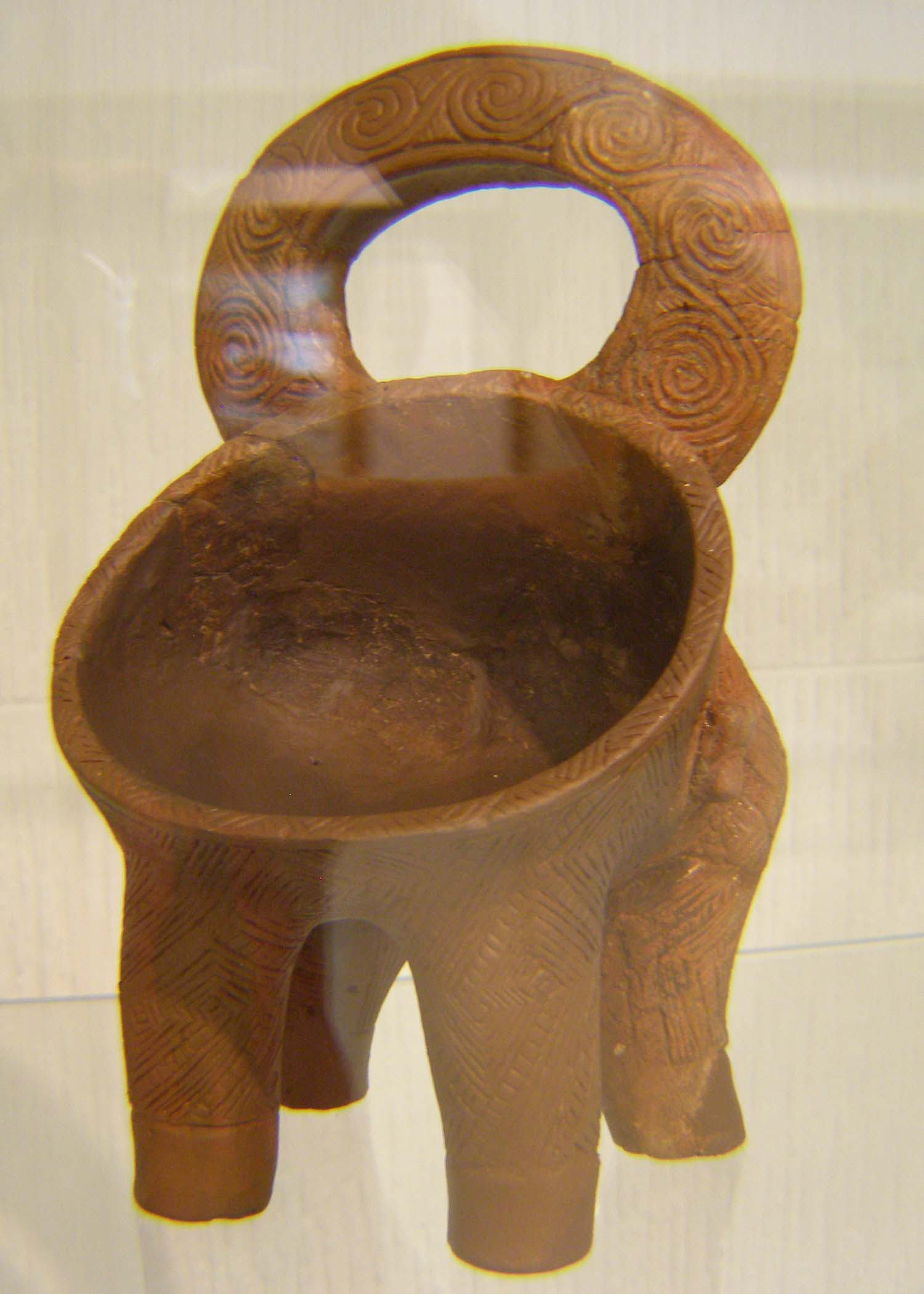
Danilo culture ceramic vessel

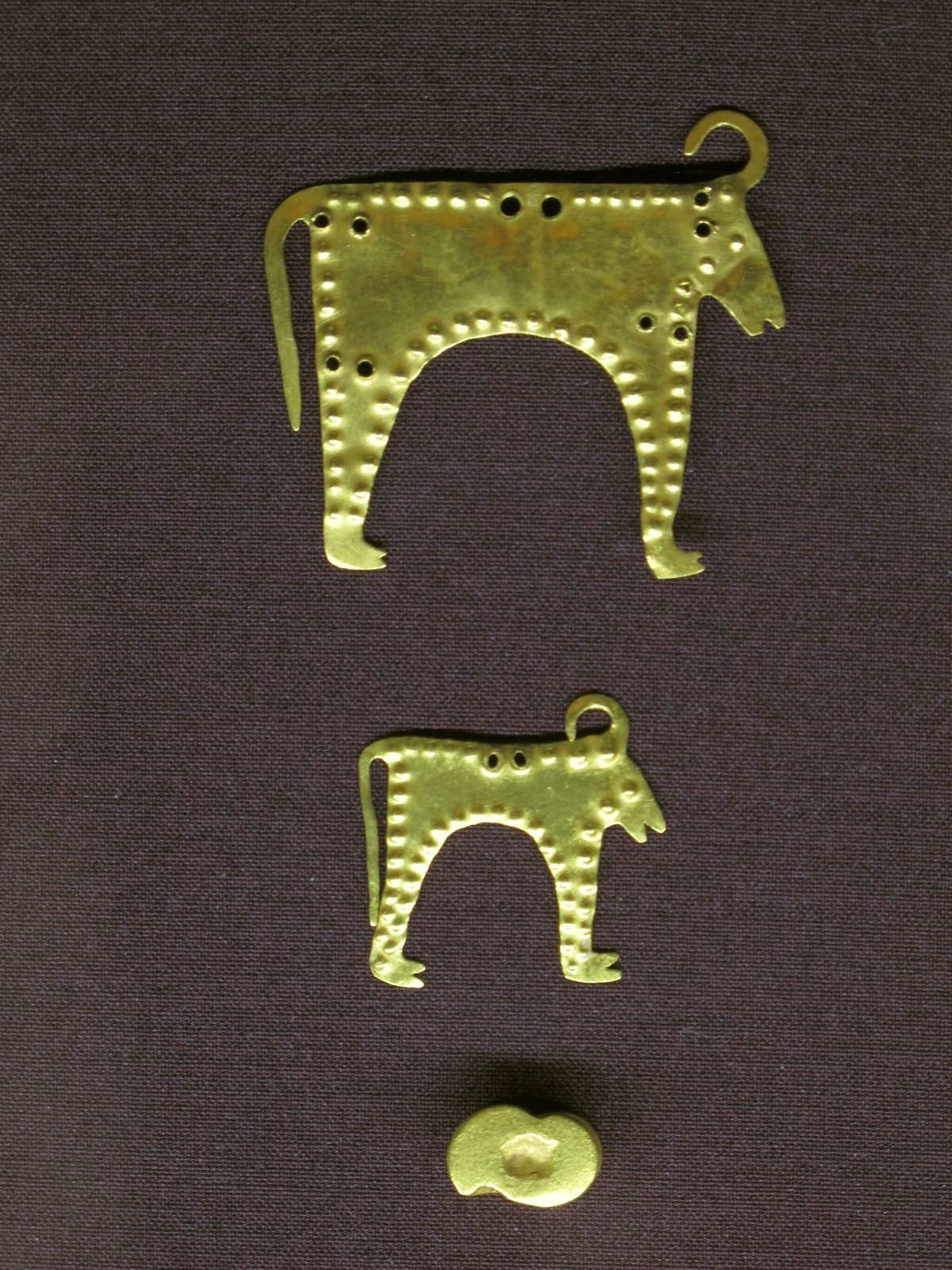
Varna culture gold pendants

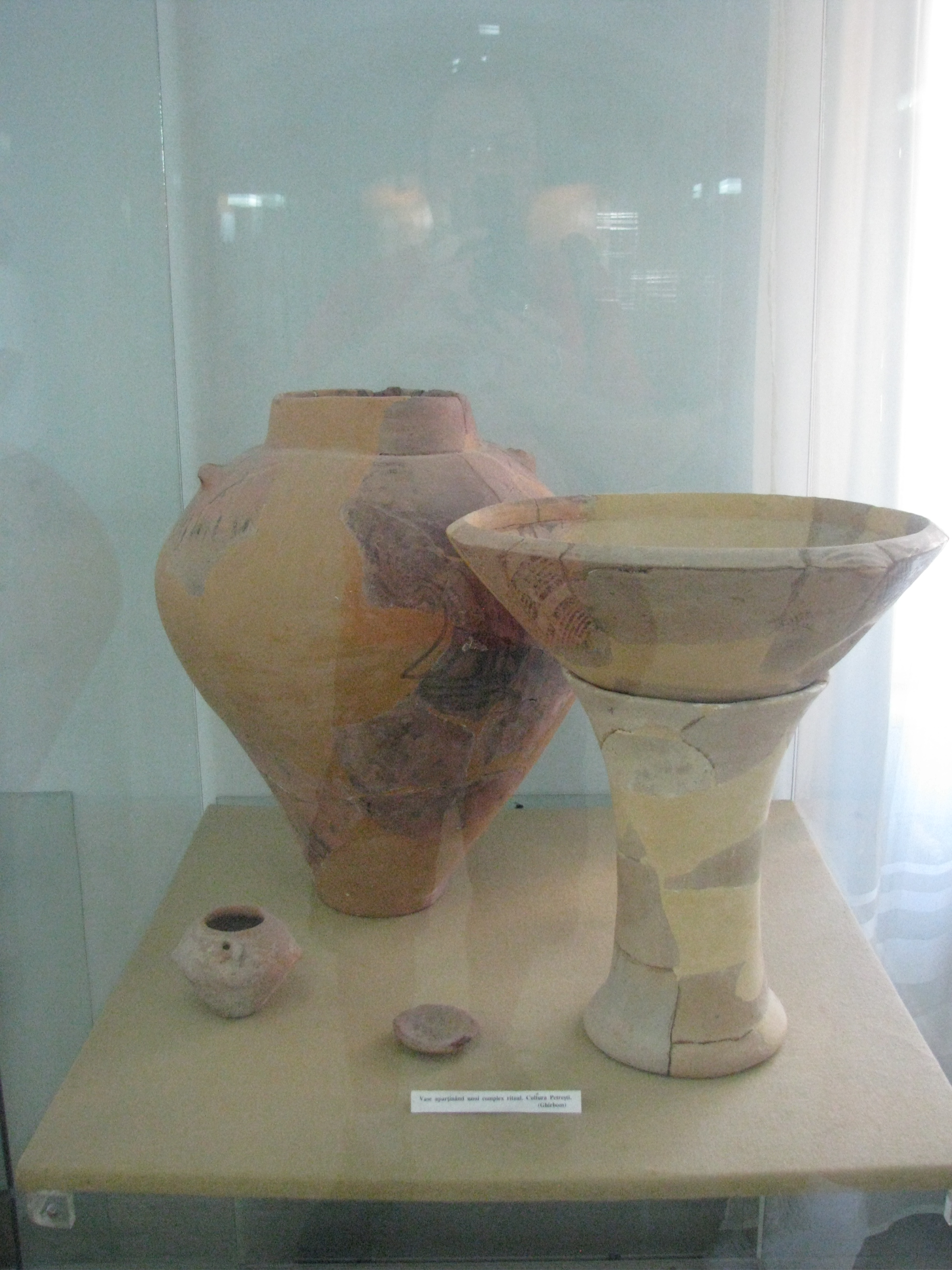
Petresti culture pottery

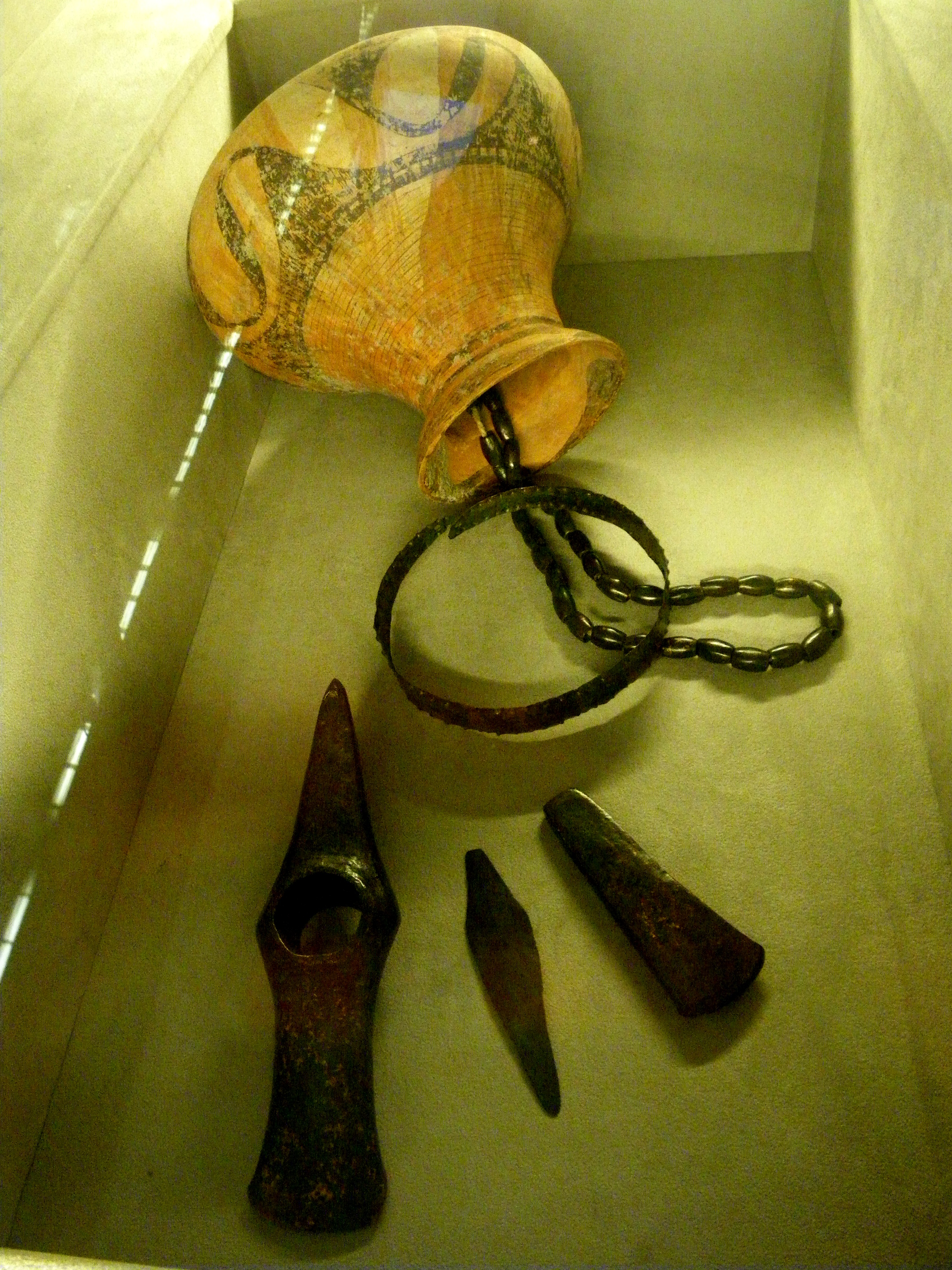
Cucuteni–Trypillia ceramic and copper artefacts

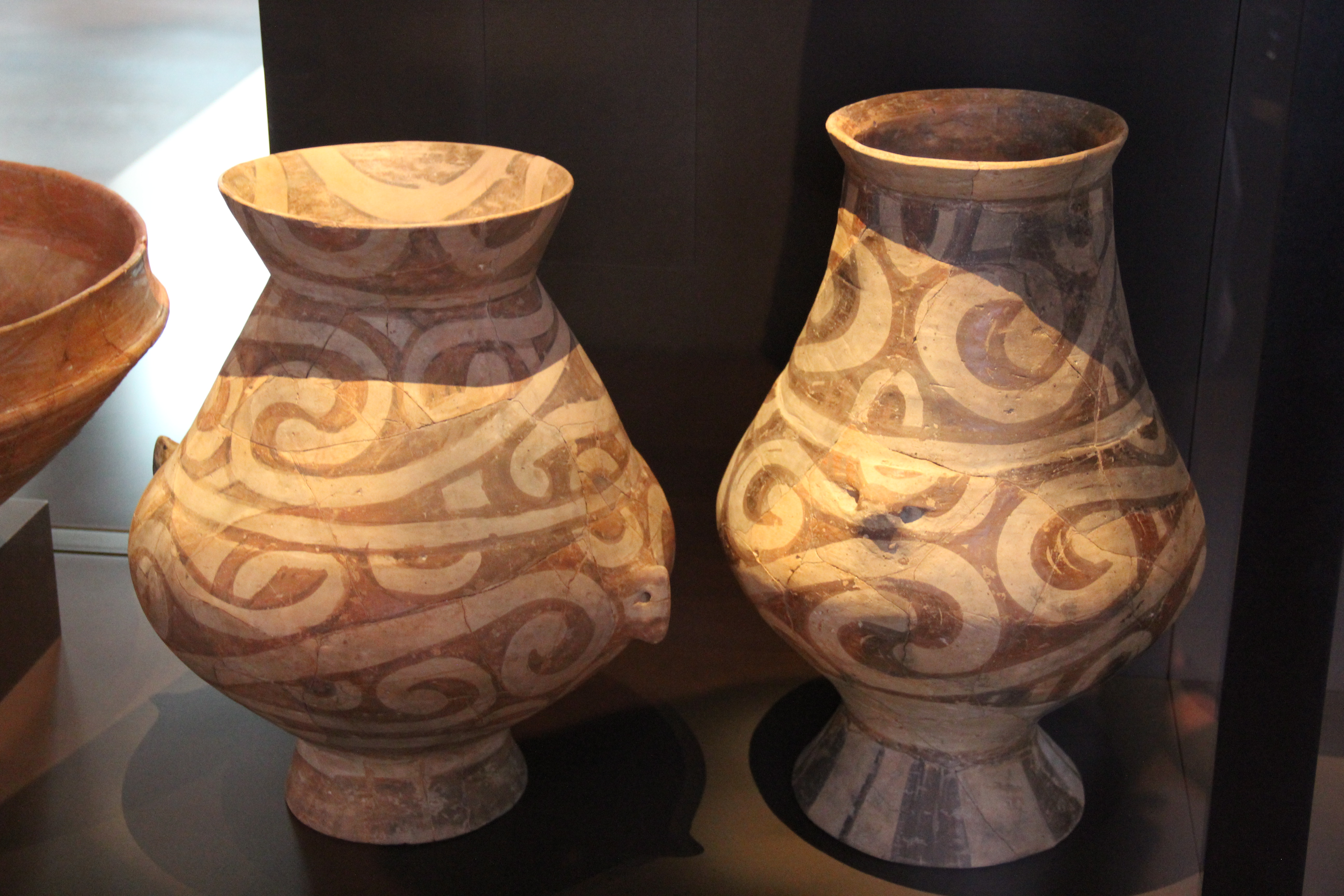
Cucuteni–Trypillia ceramics

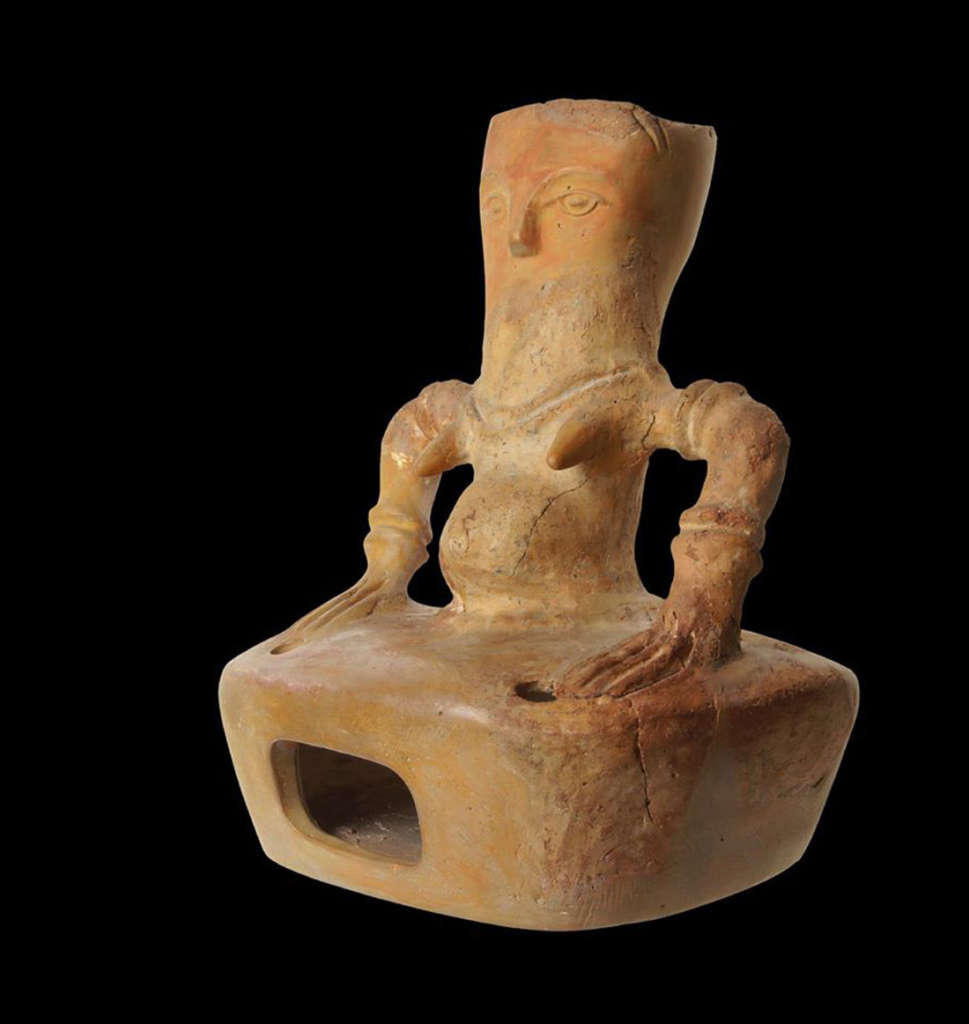
Ceramic figurine, Starčevo–Körös–Criș culture

=== Settlements ===
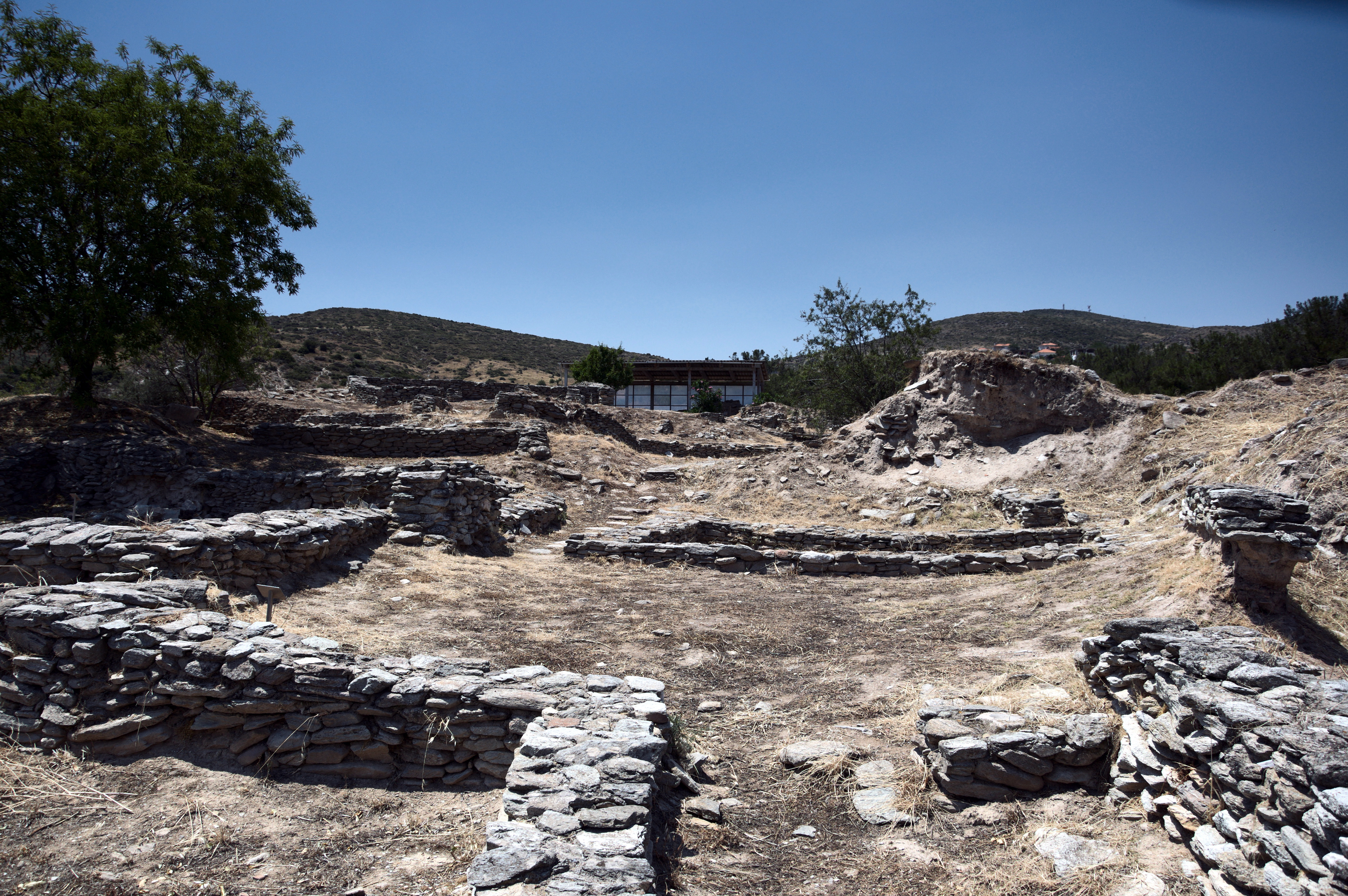
Sesklo, Sesklo culture, c. 5800 BC

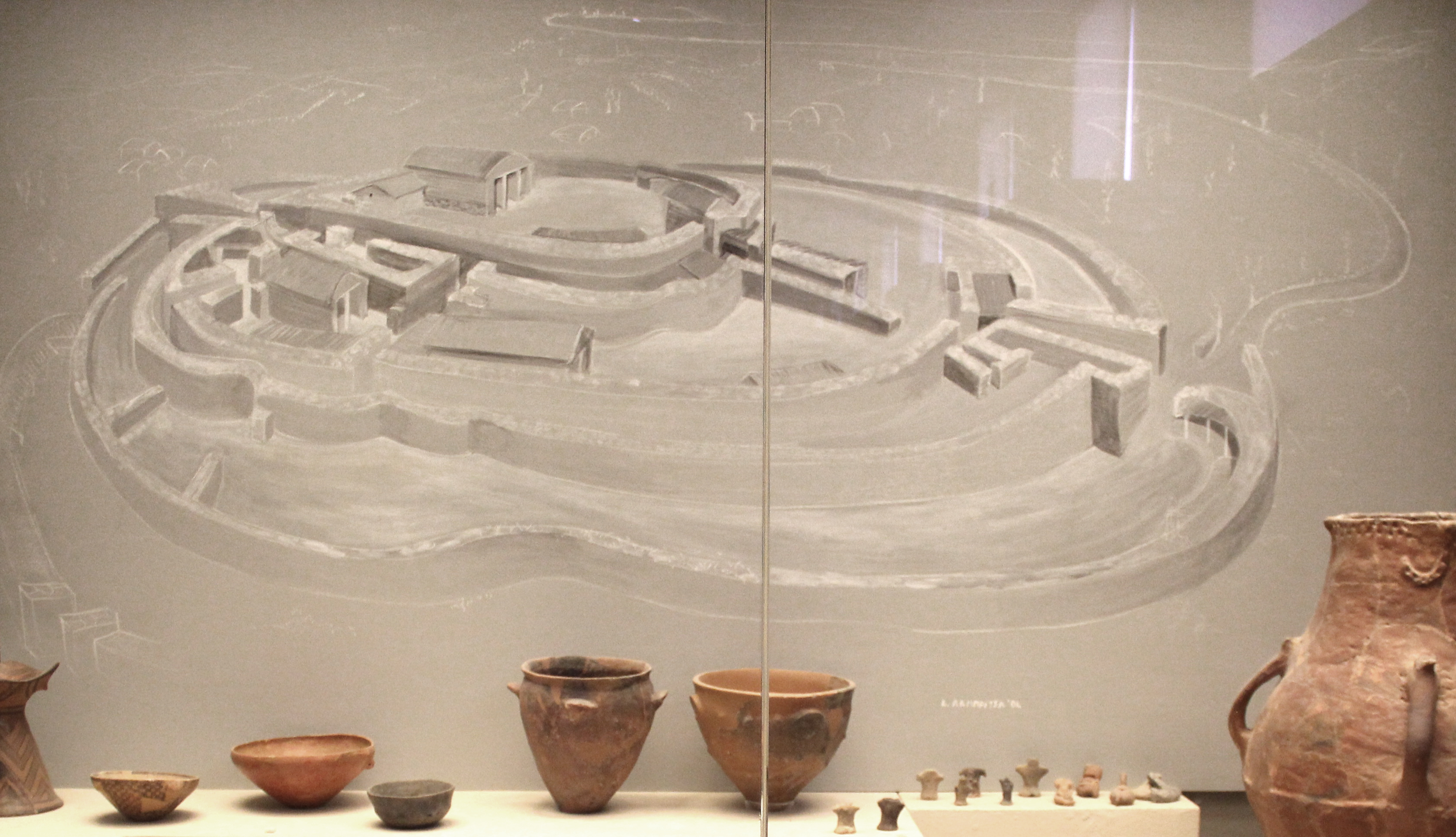
Dimini walled acropolis

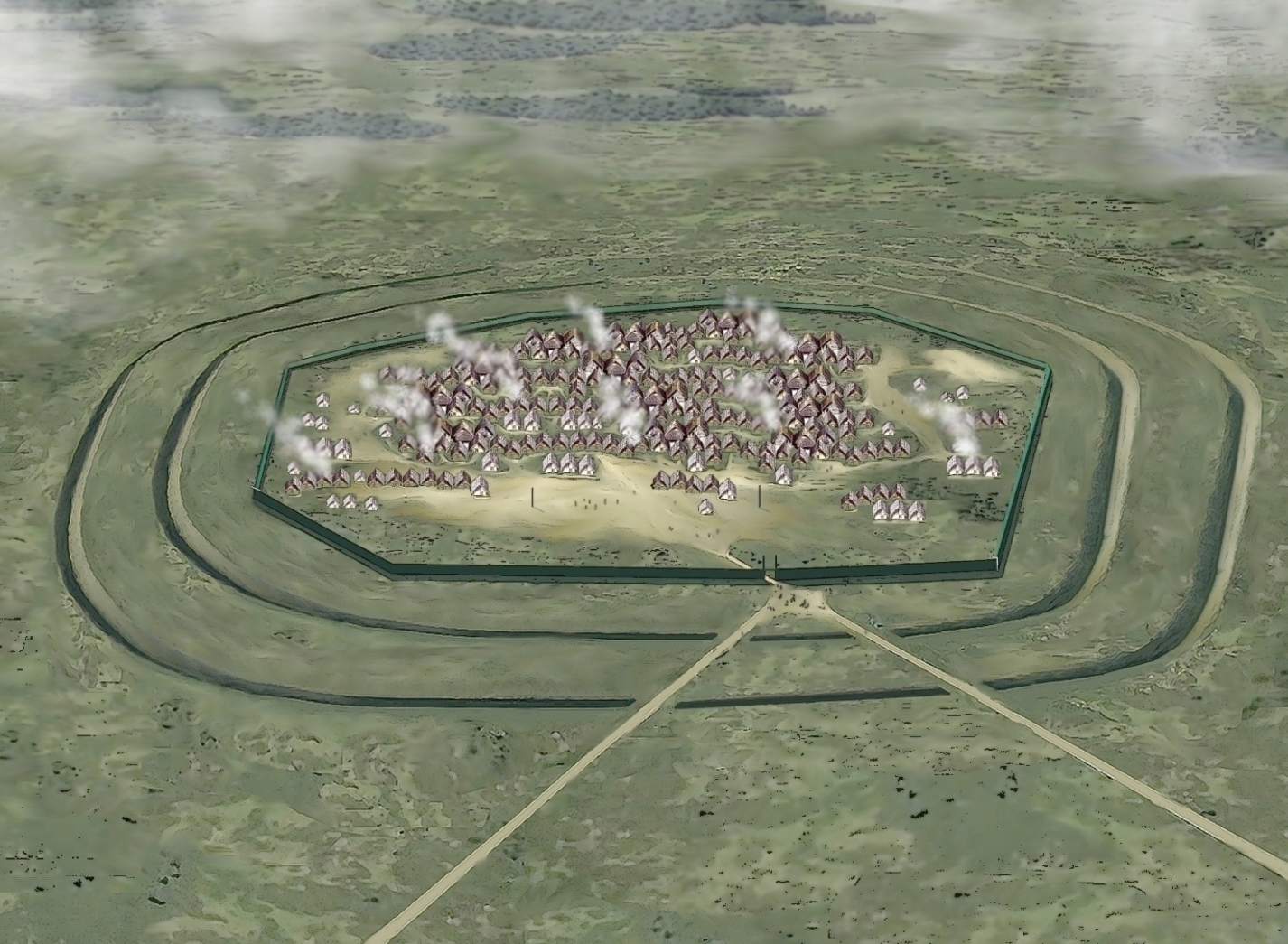
Okoliste, Butmir culture

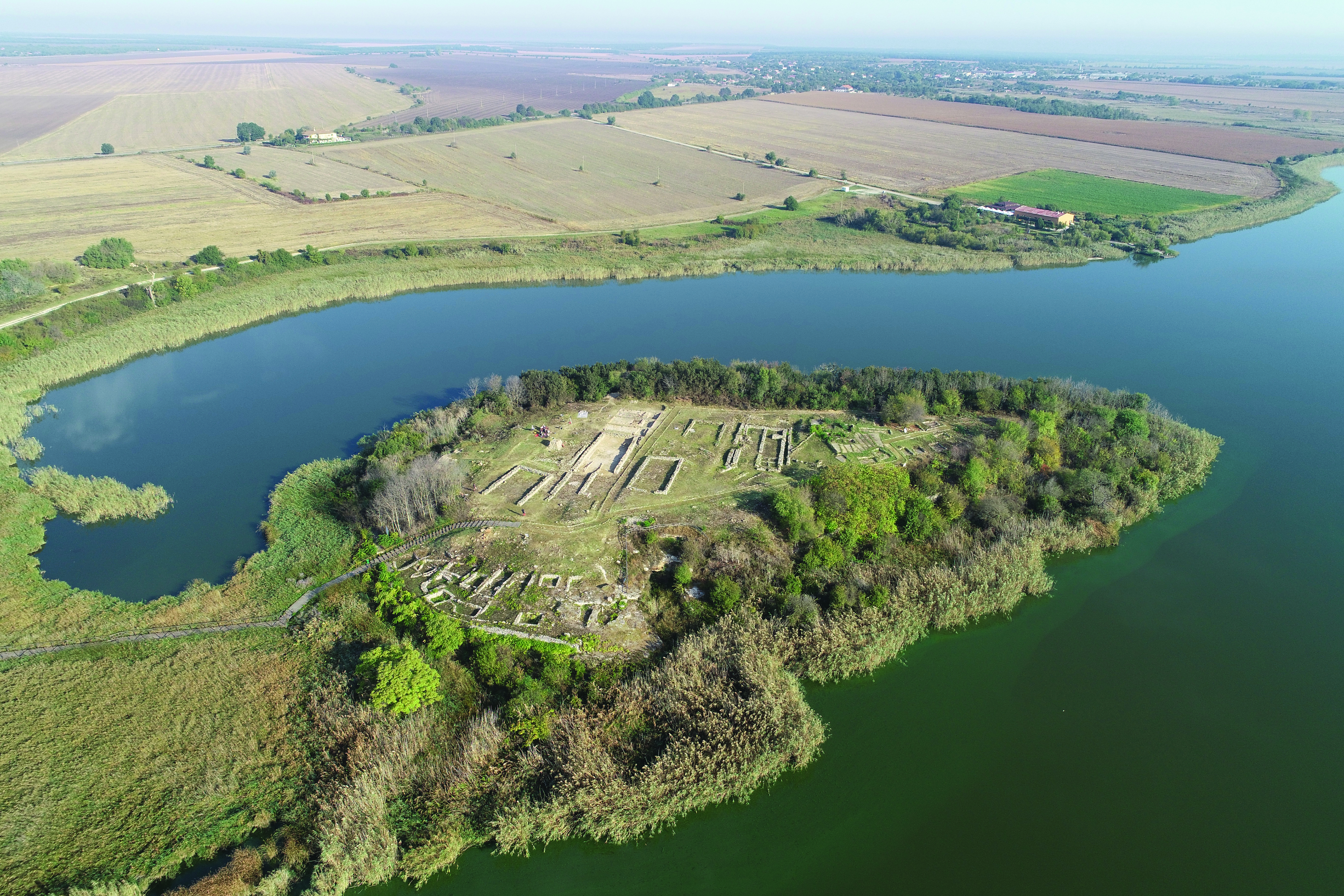
Durankulak, Varna/ Hamangia culture

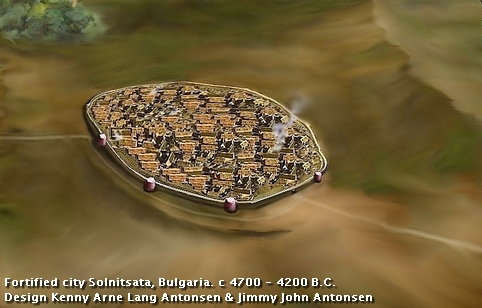
Solnitsata, Varna culture

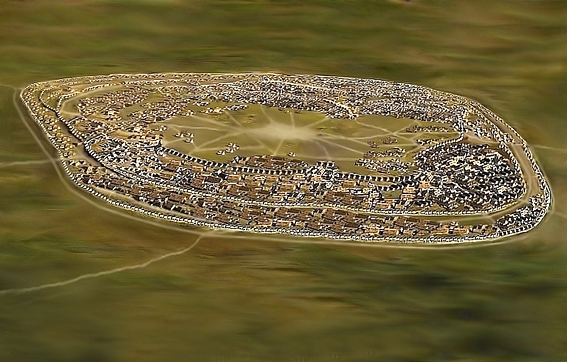
Talianki, Cucuteni–Trypillia culture

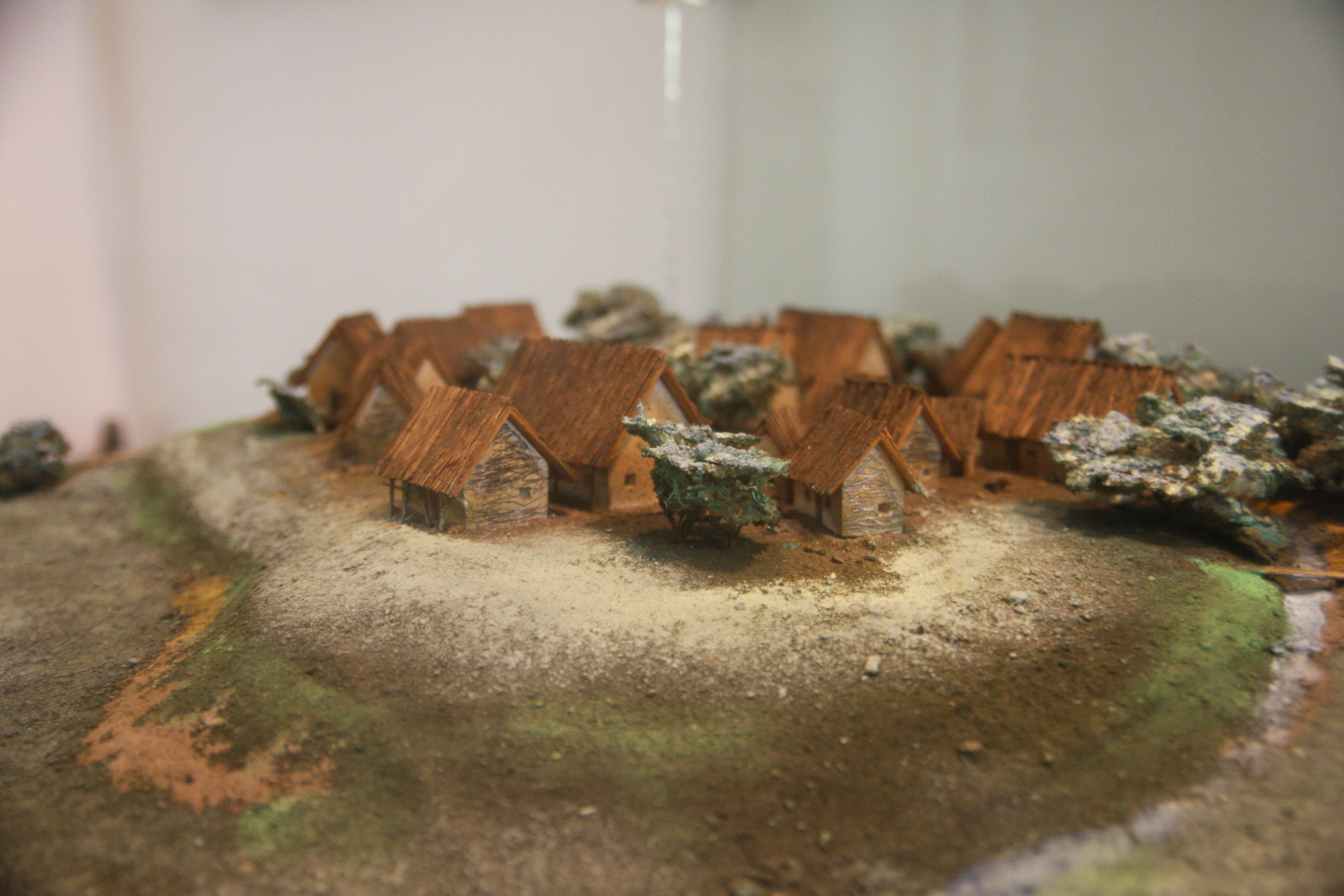
Village model, Cucuteni culture

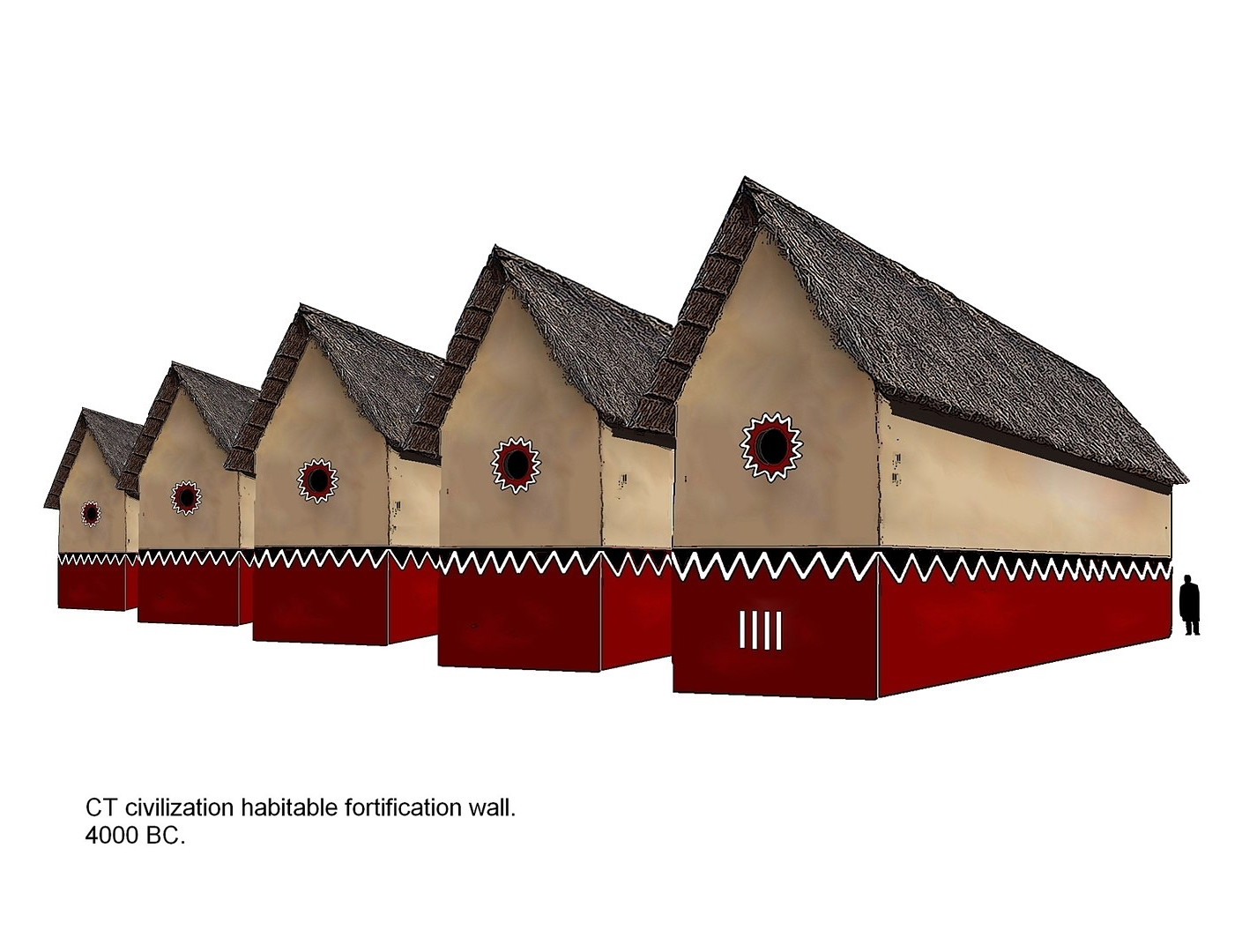
Houses, Cucuteni–Trypillia culture

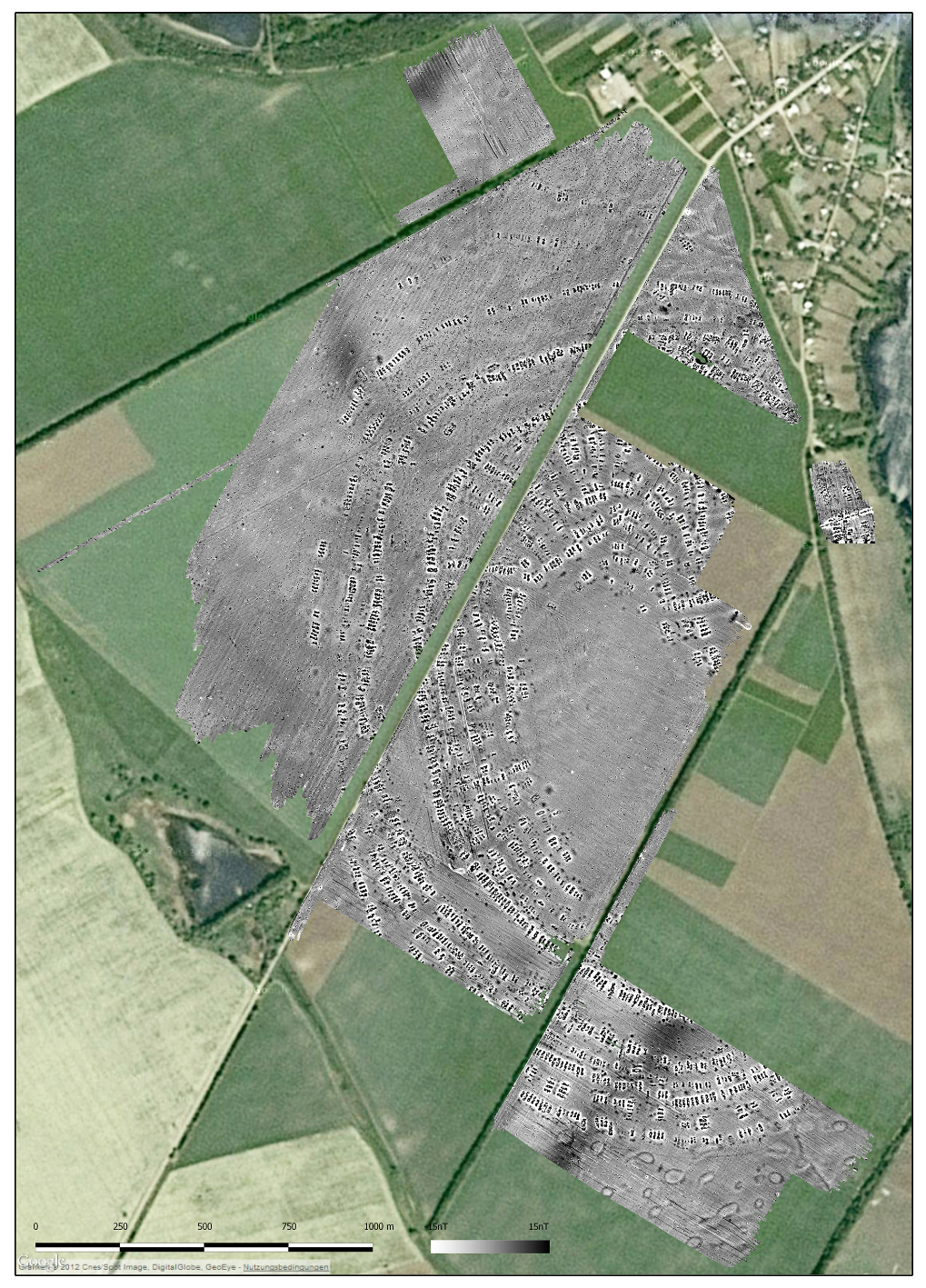
Maidanetske ground plan, Ukraine

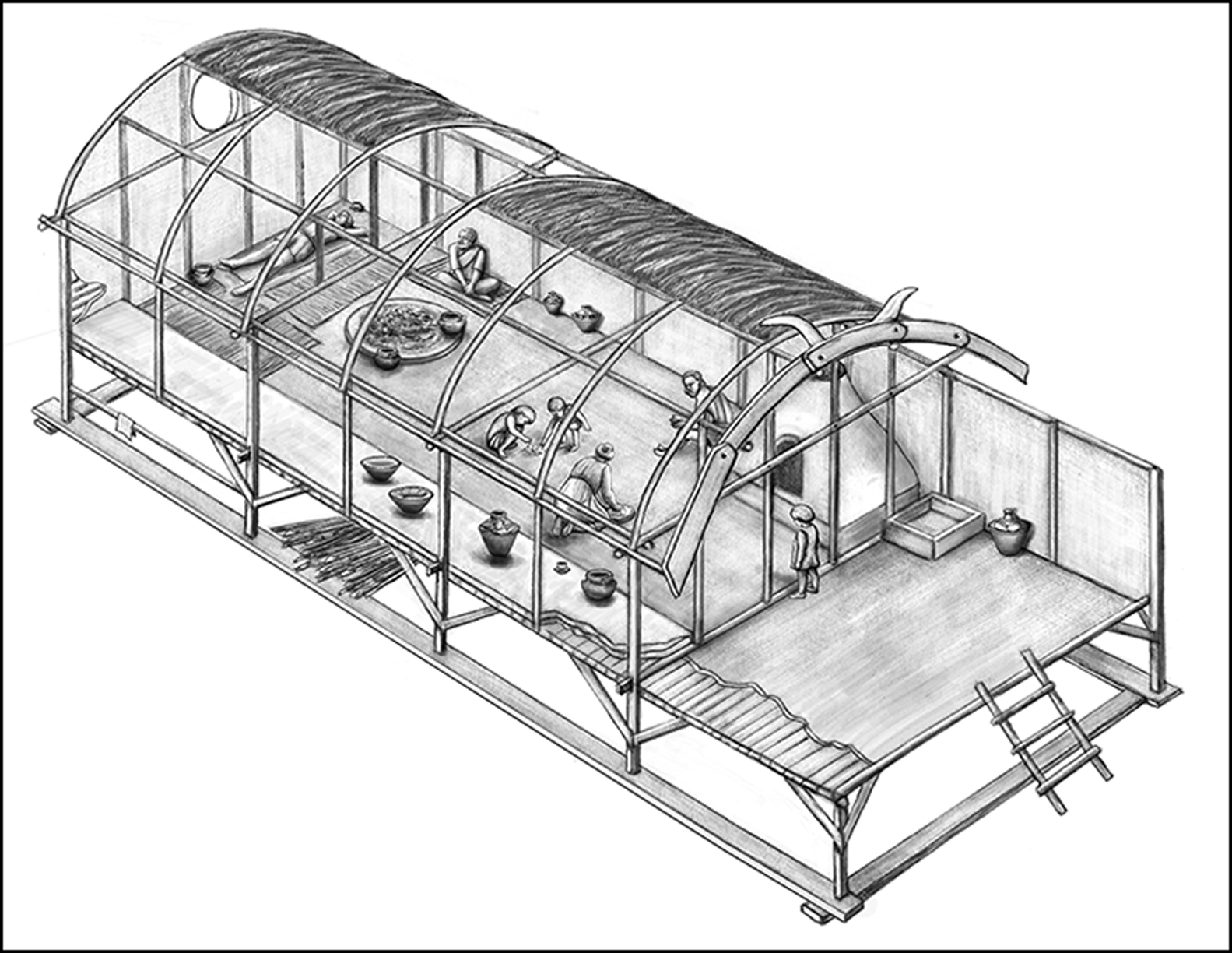
House with raised platform at Maidanetsk, c. 3700 BC

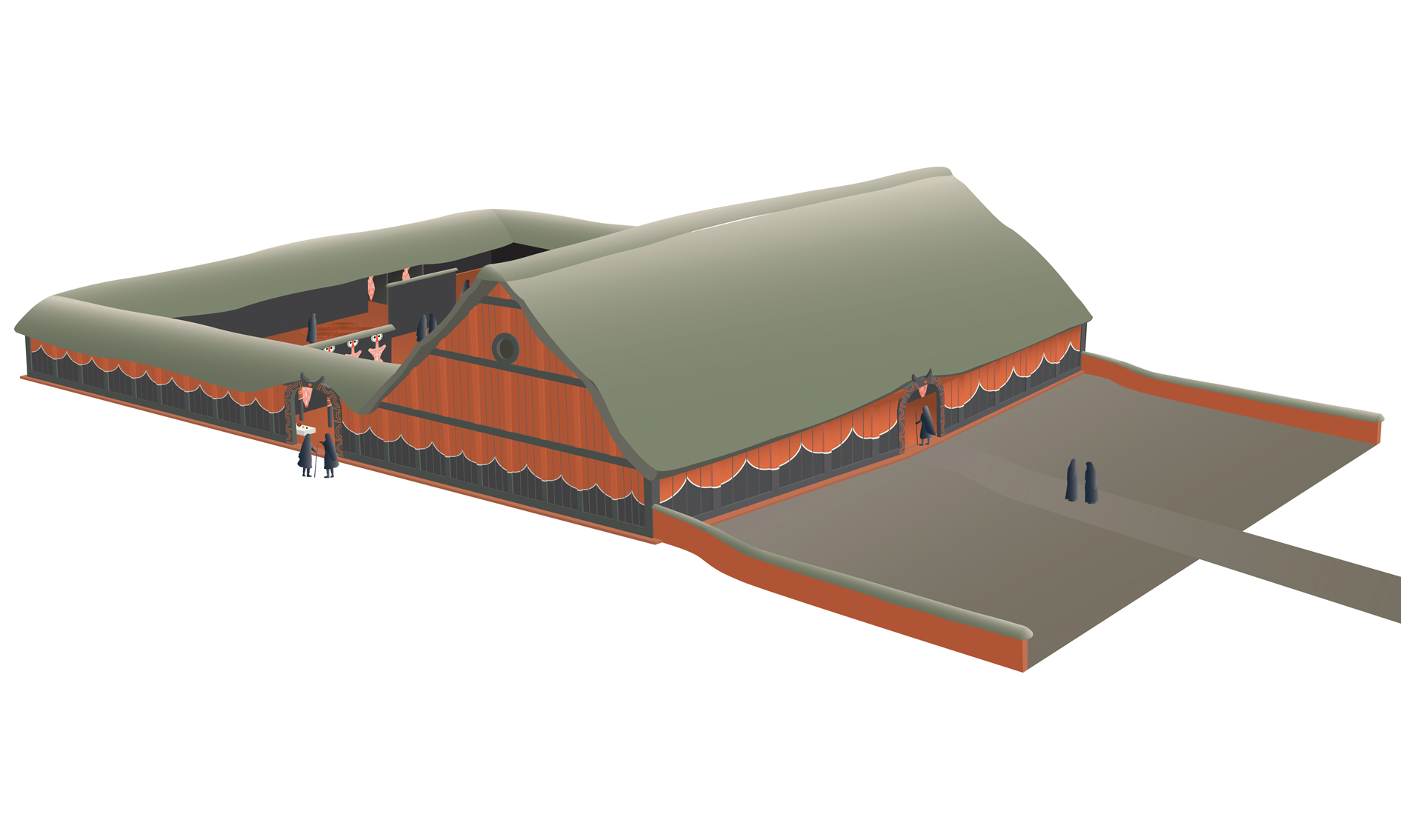
Nebelivka temple, Cucuteni–Trypillia culture

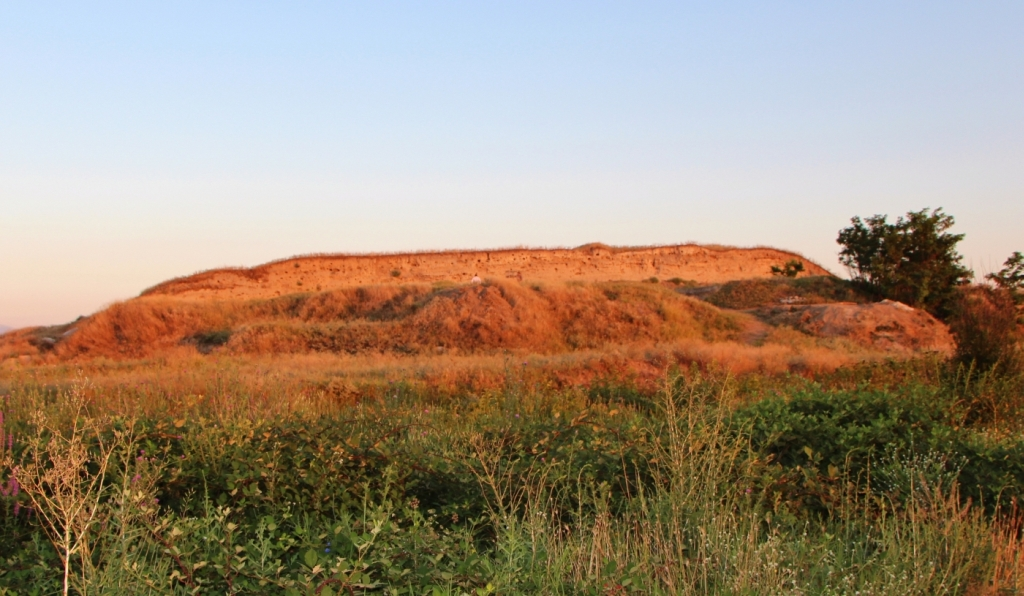
Tell Yunatsite, Karanovo culture

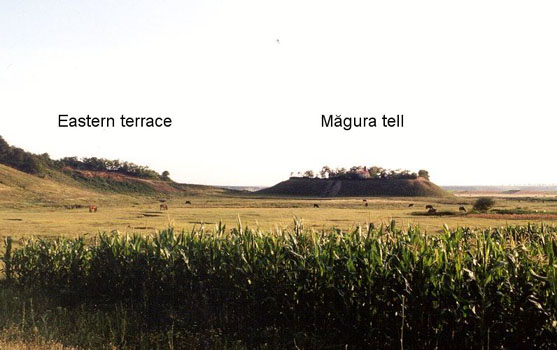
Magura tell site, Gumelnița culture

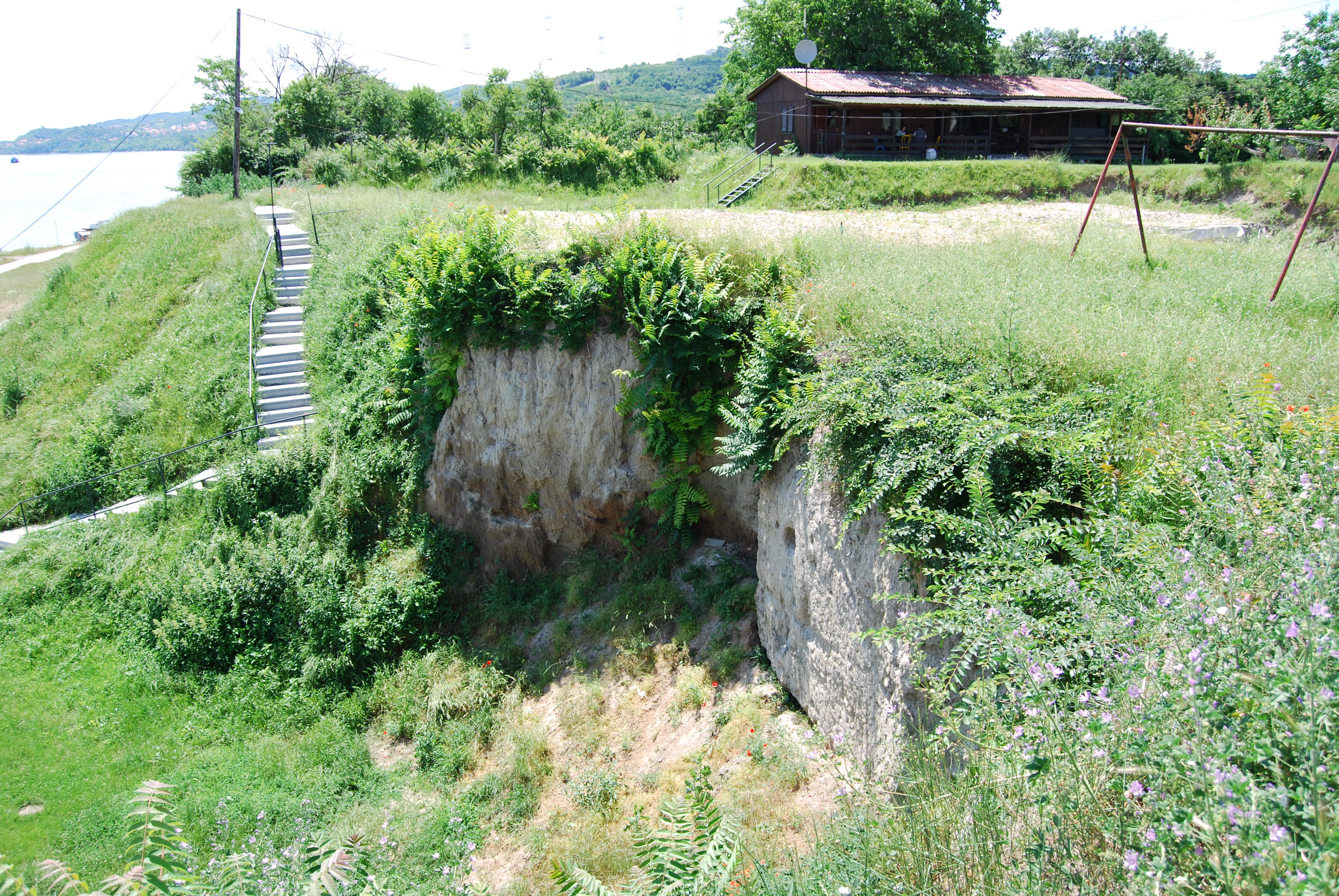
Vinča-Belo Brdo, Vinča culture

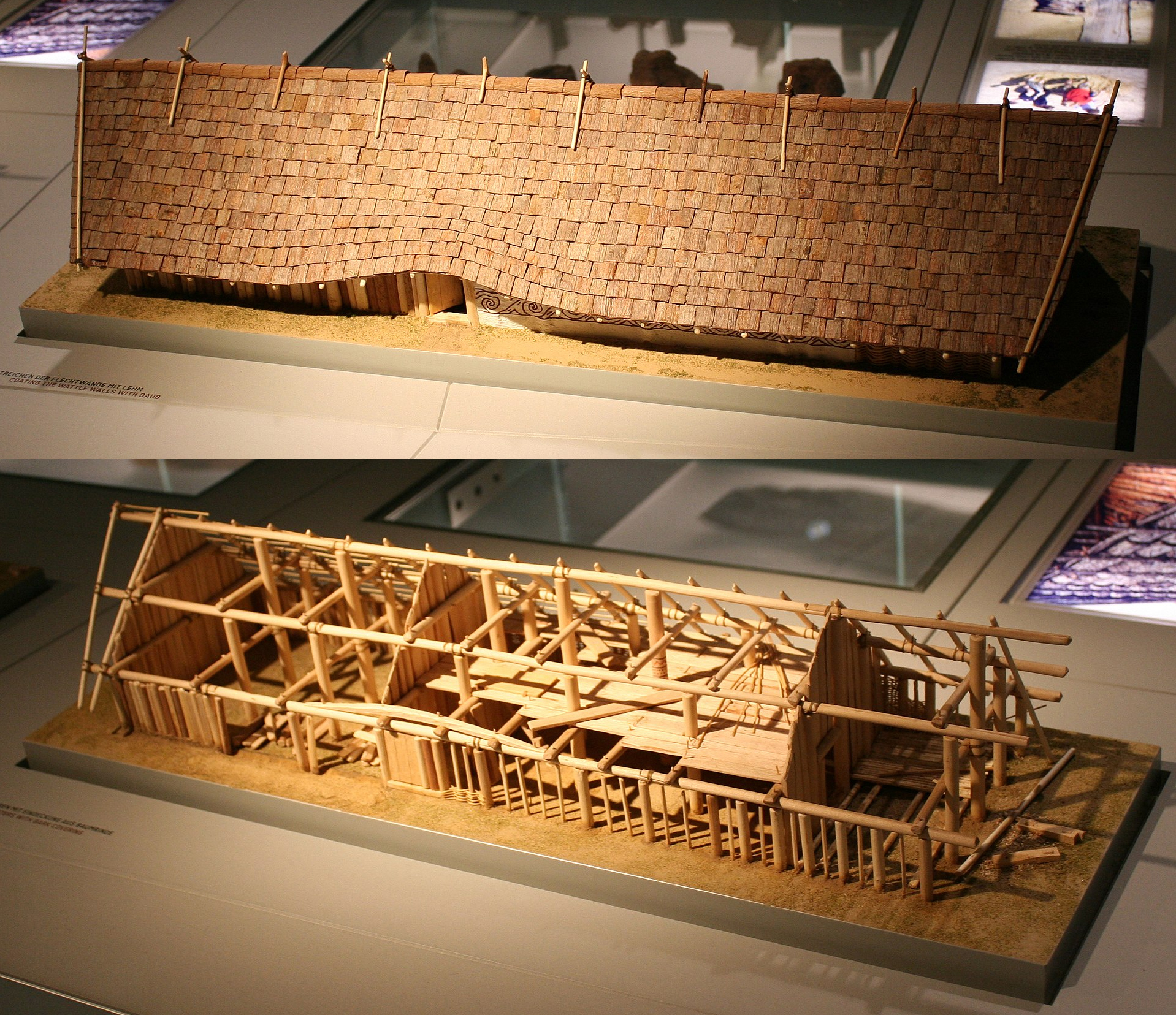
Longhouse model, Linear Pottery culture

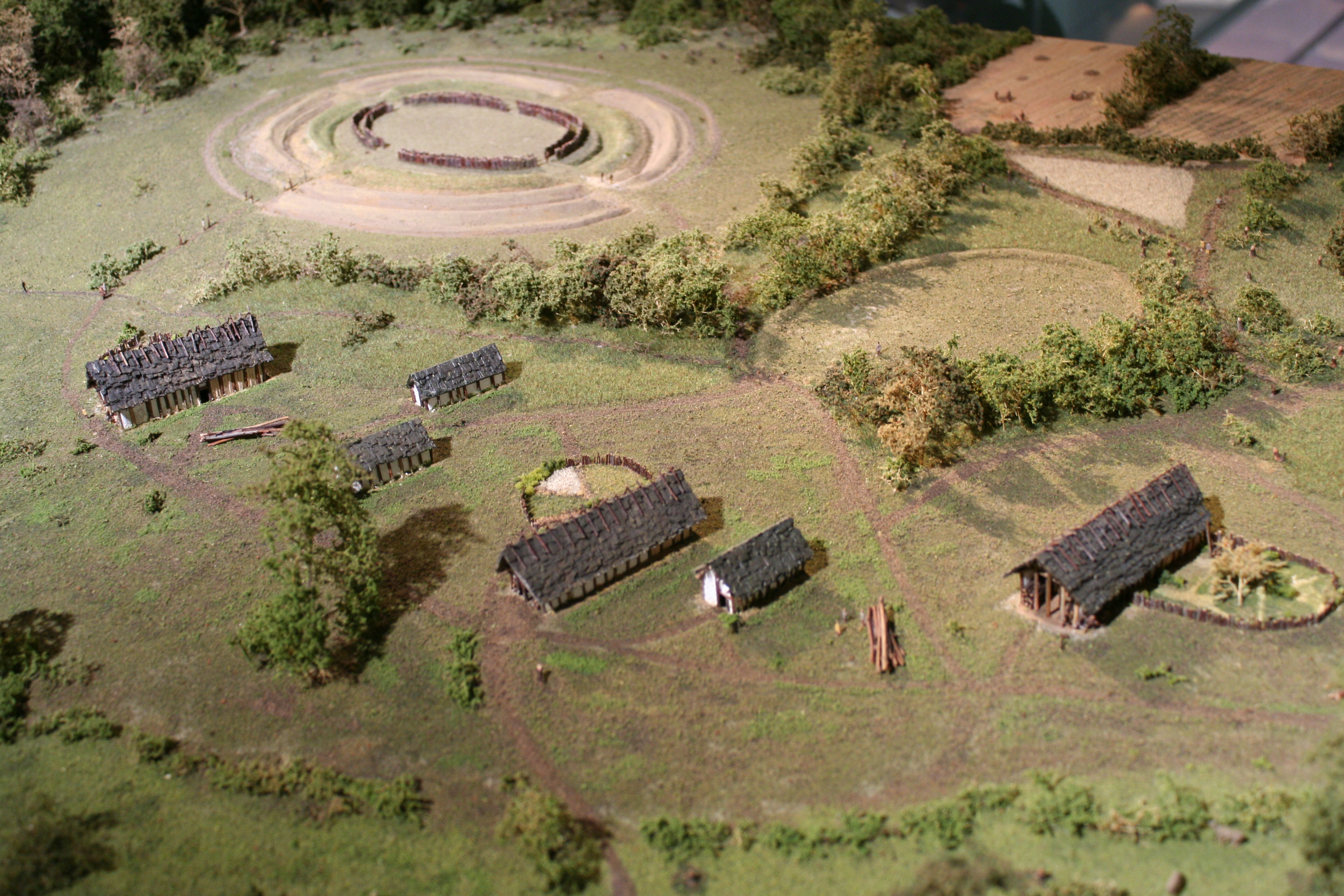
Linear Pottery culture settlement

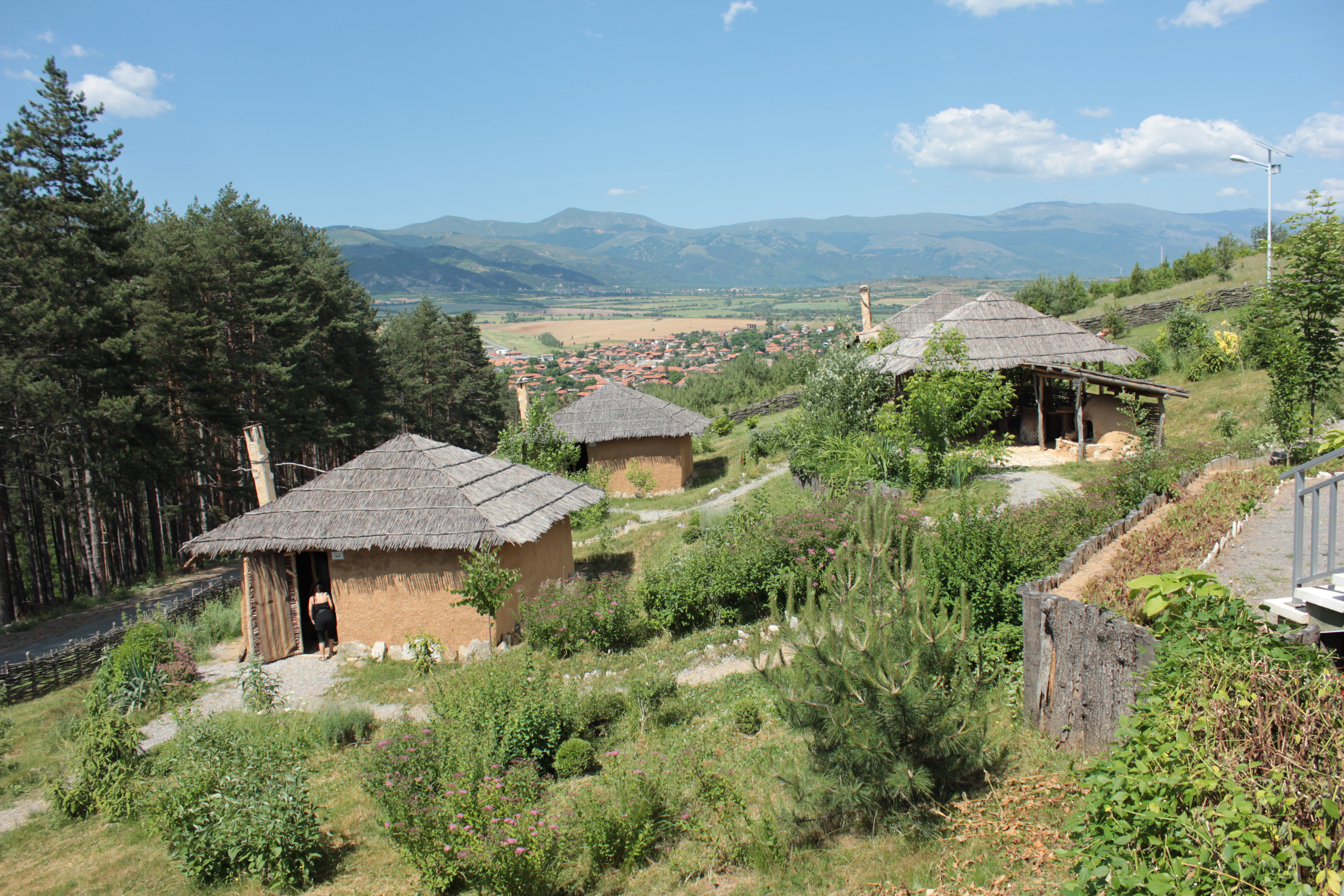
Neolithic house reconstructions, Karanovo culture

== Maps ==
Middle Neolithic

Late Neolithic

== See also ==
- Prehistoric Europe
- Bronze Age Europe
- Early European Farmers
- Prehistory of Southeastern Europe
- Old European script
- Neolithic circular enclosures in Central Europe
- Tell Yunatsite
- Bükk culture
- Proto-Indo-European language
- Proto-Indo-Europeans
- Indo-Iranians
- Pre-Greek substrate
- Germanic substrate hypothesis
- Goidelic substrate hypothesis
- Anatolian hypothesis

== Sources ==
- Anthony, David (1995). "Nazi and eco-feminist prehistories: ideology and empiricism in Indo-European archaeology". Nationalism, politics, and the practice of archaeology. Cambridge: Cambridge University Press. ISBN 978-0-521-55839-6.
- Anthony, David W (2007). The horse, the wheel, and language: how Bronze-Age riders from the Eurasian steppes shaped the modern world. Princeton, NJ: Princeton University Press. ISBN 978-0-691-14818-2.
- Mallory, JP (1991). In search of the Indo-Europeans: language, archaeology and myth. London: Thames and Hudson. ISBN 0-500-27616-1.
- Paliga, Sorin (1989). "Proto-Indo-European, Pre-Indo-European, Old European: Archaeological Evidence and Linguistic Investigation". Journal of Indo-European Studies. 17 (3&4): 309–334. ISSN 0092-2323.
- Renfrew, Colin (1987). Archaeology and language: the puzzle of Indo-European origins. London: Jonathan Cape. ISBN 0-521-38675-6.
- Renfrew, Colin (2003). "Time Depth, Convergence Theory, and Innovation in Proto-Indo-European". Languages in Prehistoric Europe. Winter. ISBN 3-8253-1449-9.
