= Henrieta Todorova =

Bulgarian archaeologist (1933–2015)

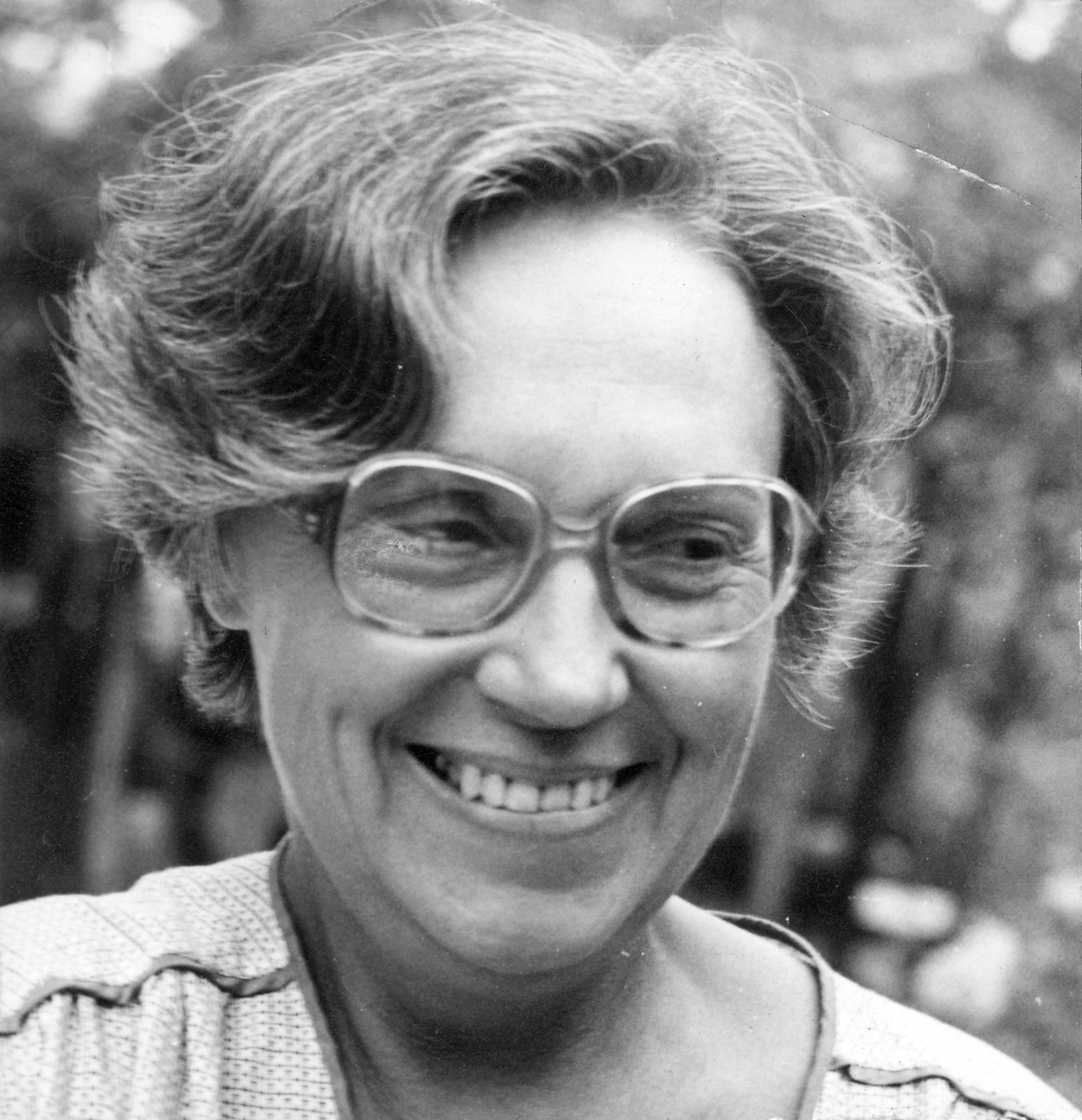
- Todorova in 2000
- Born: Henrieta Theodor Blank; 25 February 1933; Sofia, Kingdom of Bulgaria
- Died: 12 April 2015 (aged 82); Sofia, Bulgaria
- Other names: Henrieta Vajsová, Henrieta Todorova-Simeonova
- Occupation: Archaeologist
- Years active: 1967—2012
- Known for: La période néolithique et énéolithique en Bulgarie

Henrieta Todorova (Bulgarian: Хенриета Тодорова; 25 February 1933 – 12 April 2015) was a Bulgarian archaeologist, specialist in prehistory and professor. She was a corresponding member of the Bulgarian Academy of Sciences, corresponding member of the German Archaeological Institute in Berlin, and a foreign member of the academy Leibniz Scientific Society (Leibniz-Sozietät der Wissenschaften) in Berlin.

== Biography ==
Henrieta Todorova was born as Henrieta Theodor Blank on 25 February 1933 in Sofia. Her father, Hugo Carl Theodor Blank, was German. Her mother, Maria Statkova, was Bulgarian. She had a younger sister, Elsa. After World War II, she changed her German surname Theodor to Todorova.

In the 1950s, she married Augustin Vais from Slovakia, with whom she had a son, Ivan (Iven). He is also an archaeologist. The marriage was dissolved. She then married Yordan Simeonov, with whom she had a daughter, Iveta. This marriage was also dissolved.

Henrieta Todorova began her higher education at Sofia University. She graduated in 1954 from Comenius University in Bratislava, majoring in history and philosophy. In 1964 she defended her dissertation at the Archaeological Institute of the Slovak Academy of Sciences in Nitra on the topic "Eneolithic ceramics from Thrace and Northeastern Bulgaria". Its scientific supervisor is Antonin Točík. In the same year he received a doctorate (PhD) from Comenius University.

Her life is connected with the Archaeological Institute in Sofia (Bulgaria). Since 1967, after winning a competition, he has been working at the Archaeological Institute at the Bulgarian Academy of Sciences. In 1978, he defended his dissertation (habilitation thesis) on "Eneolithic Period in Bulgaria" and received the title "Doctor of Historical Sciences". He became a senior research associate I (professor) degree at the Archaeological Institute. From 1977 to 1979, he was scientific secretary of the "Center for History" at the Bulgarian Academy of Sciences. Since 1978, he has been a corresponding member of the German Archaeological Institute in Berlin. He is the founder of the Problem Group for Interdisciplinary Research at the Archaeological Institute. From 1978 to 1990, he was its head. From 1989 to 1993, he was deputy director of the Archaeological Institute from the team of Prof. Velizar Velkov. From 1982 to 1994, she was a member of the Scientific Council of the Archaeological Institute. From 1982 to 2000 and 2004 to 2010, she was a member of the "Specialized Council for Ancient History, Archaeology and Ethnography" at the High Attestation Commission. From 1984 to 1994, she was a member of the "Historical Commission at the High Attestation Commission Bulgarian". In 2004, she was elected a corresponding member of the Bulgarian Academy of Sciences, and in 2007 - a foreign member of the prestigious Leibniz Society in Berlin.

Todorova died on 12 April 2015 at the age of 82. At her request, her body was cremated. Some of the ashes were scattered at Durankulak.

== Scientific activity ==
Todorova was the author of 18 monographs, over 150 studies, articles, reports and reviews published in Bulgaria and abroad. She published in Bulgarian, English, French, German, Italian and Russian. She published with the names Henrieta Vajsová, Henrieta Todorova-Simeonova and Henrieta Todorova. Her works were reviewed in the most renowned specialized publications. Her research interests included the Neolithic (Neolithic), Stone Age (Eneolithic), Bronze Age, Antiquity, Early Middle Ages, early metallurgy, climate change and their impact on human life, prehistoric societies and their transformation as a consequence of cultural relationships and much more. She discovered many of the prehistoric cultures in Bulgaria, such as: the cultures of Usoe, Sava, Ovcharovo, Polyanitsa, Kodzadermen-Gumelnița–Karanovo culture (KGK VI) and others. She was the discoverer of the earliest monochrome Neolithic in Northern Bulgaria and of the transition period from the Eneolithic to the Bronze Age. He studies and makes available to science the prehistory of Northeastern Bulgaria and the western Black Sea coast. Characteristic of Herieta Todorova's scientific work was the consideration of the archaeological data in a broad, over regional aspect, which turned them into important historical sources. Her contributions to the study of the earliest metallurgy in the Balkans are also significant. She considered the results of the study of the archaeological complex near the village of Durankulak as one of her most significant achievements.

She taught courses and lectured at the Sofia University "St. Kliment Ohridski", New Bulgarian University and the University of Veliko Tărnovo "St. St. Cyril and Methodius". She delivered public lectures to promote the achievements of Bulgarian prehistory in Berlin, Frankfurt, Cologne, Heidelberg and other cities in Germany. She was a visiting professor at several universities: in 1988 - in Bonn (Germany); in 1990 - in Hadjettepe in Ankara (Turkey); in 1999-2000 - in Freiberg (Germany); in 2007-2008 - in Heidelberg (Germany).

Henrieta Todorova was a participant in numerous international scientific congresses, symposia and conferences. From 1979 to 1996 she was a member of the leadership of the International Scientific Forum "Problems of the prehistory of the Lower Danube region". He has participated in 14 of its international symposia: 2 in Slovakia, 2 in the Czech Republic, 2 in Hungary, 2 in Italy, 2 in Georgia, 2 in the former Yugoslavia and 2 in Greece. Henrietta Todorova is a participant in numerous international scientific congresses, symposia and conferences. She was the organizer of three international symposia on prehistory in Bulgaria: 1978 "Pulpudaeva Praehistoricus" in Plovdiv (Bulgaria); 1988 "Pontus Praehistoricus" in Dobrich (Bulgaria); 2004 "Strymon Praehistoricus" in Kyustendil–Blagoevgrad–Seres–Amphipolis (Bulgaria-Greece).

In 1984 - 1986 she participated in the Bulgarian-German project "Sadovets" (project of the Bavarian Academy of Sciences). In 1993-1998 she participated in a project of the Max Planck Institutes in Mainz and Heidelberg for the study of the earliest metallurgy in Bulgaria. In 1993-2007 she was the leader of the Bulgarian team in the Greek-Bulgarian project "Promahon-Topolnica".

Henrietta Todorova was also the editor-in-chief of the Durankulak scientific series, published by the German Archaeological Institute in Berlin; member of the editorial board of Sbornik Dobrudja from its foundation until 2002; co-editor of the series In the Steps of J.H. Gaul. For some time she was also the editor-in-chief of the Studia Praehistorica magazine.

== Recognition ==
- In 2003, Henrieta Todorova was entered into the Honorary Book of the city of Dobrich (Bulgaria) by Order No. 139 of 5 March 2003..
- In 2003, a collection was published in her honor (issue 21 of the journal "Sbornik Dobrudja", 2003).
- In 2007, the National Archaeological Institute with a museum at the Bulgarian Academy of Sciences published another collection in her honor – PRAE: In honorem Henrieta Todorova.
- In 2016, colleagues and friends from Romania dedicated the collection to her (In Memory of Henrieta Todorova) with scientific articles on the topic Between Earth And Heaven Symbols And Sygns. ISBN 978-606-8698-10-6.

== Bibliography ==
- Vajsova-Simeonova, Henrieta. In: Jan Filip (Ed.). Encyclopedic Manual for Prehistoric and Early Historic Europe II, Prague 1968, p. 1562.
- Todorova, Henrieta (Simeonova) In: J. Filip and J. Harlan (Ed's.). Encyclopedic Manual for Prehistoric and Early Historic Europe III — adenda, Prague 1998, p. 386.
- Todorova-Vajsova, Henrieta. In: Петър Чолов (Ed.). Български историци: Биографично-библиографски справочник. Sofia 1981, p. 386.
- Васил Николов. Юбилей на проф. д.и.н. Хенриета Тодорова. — Археология 44/1, 2003, pp. 67—68.
- R. Krauß, Henrieta Todorova 1933-2015. Über die Liebe zur deutschen Sprache und zur Archäologie. Praehistorische Zeitschrift 91, 2016, 220–224.
