= Varna culture =

Prehistoric culture in Bulgaria (ca. 4500 BCE)

- Horizon: Old Europe
- Period: Chalcolithic
- Dates: c. 4550 BC – c. 4,100 BC
- Type site: Varna Necropolis, Solnitsata, Durankulak
- Preceded by: Karanovo culture, Hamangia culture, Gumelnița culture
- Followed by: Cernavodă culture

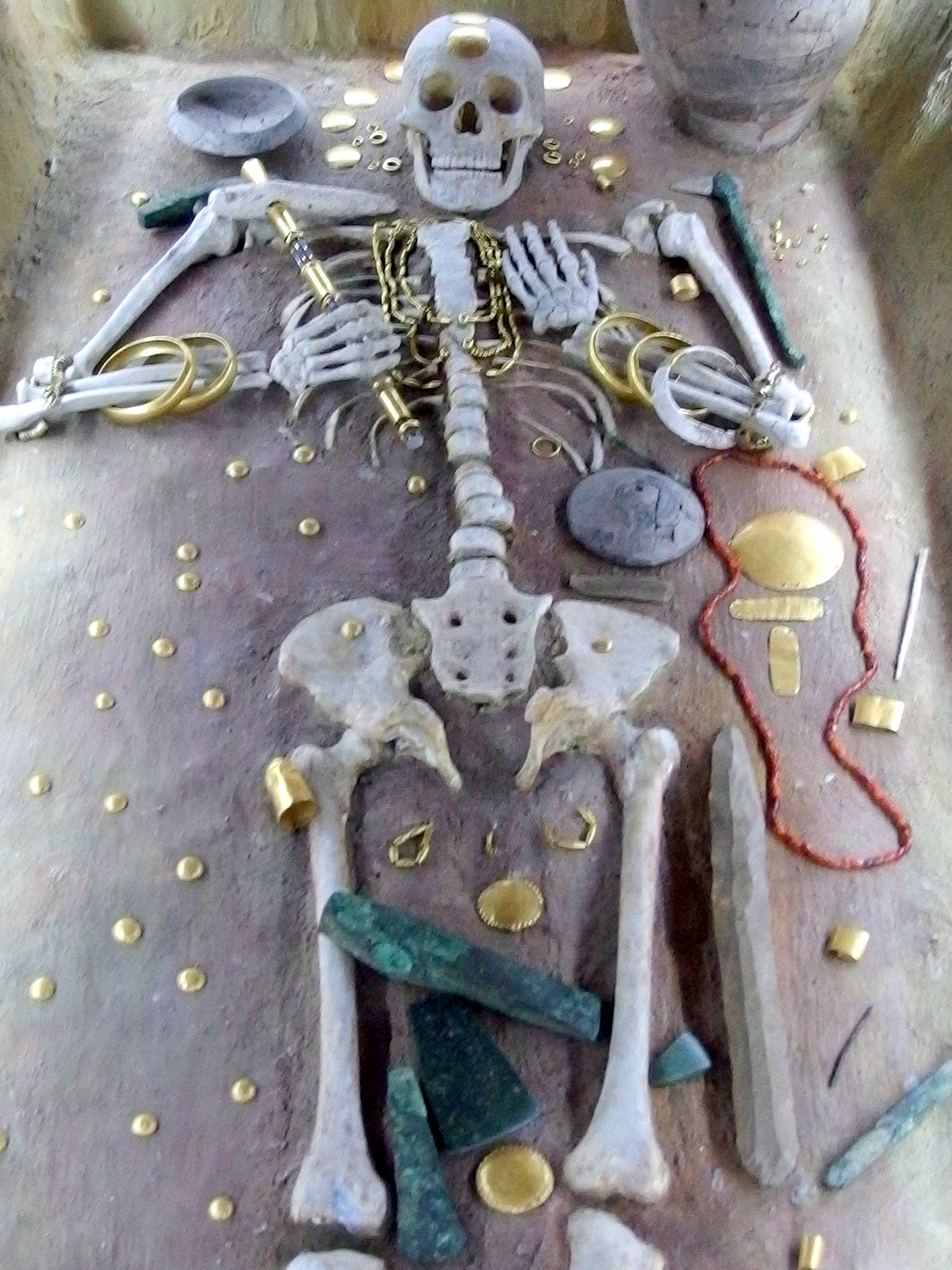
Reconstruction of elite burial at the Varna necropolis

The Varna culture was a Chalcolithic culture of northeastern Bulgaria, dated c. 4500 BC, contemporary and closely related with the Gumelnița culture. The oldest golden artifacts in the world (c. 4500 BC) were found in the Necropolis of Varna. These artefacts are on display in the Varna Archaeological Museum.

The site was accidentally discovered in October 1972 by excavator operator Raycho Marinov. Research excavation was under the direction of Mihail Lazarov and Ivan Ivanov. About 30% of the estimated necropolis area is still not excavated.

The Varna culture is characterized by polychrome pottery and rich cemeteries, the most famous of which are Varna Necropolis, the eponymous site, and the Durankulak lake complex, which comprises the largest prehistoric cemetery in southeastern Europe, with an adjoining coeval Neolithic settlement (published) and an unpublished and incompletely excavated Chalcolithic settlement. 294 graves have been found in the Varna necropolis, many containing sophisticated examples of the oldest gold metallurgy in the world, copper metallurgy, pottery (about 600 pieces, including gold-painted ones), high-quality flint and obsidian blades, beads, and shells.

The oldest gold jewelry in the world so far, dated 4650-4450 BC, has been found in the necropolis.

The findings showed that the Varna culture had trade relations with distant lands, possibly including the lower Volga region and the Cyclades, perhaps exporting metal goods and salt from the Solnitsata rock salt mine. The copper ore used in Varna artifacts originated from the Sredna Gora mine near Stara Zagora, and Mediterranean spondylus shells found in the graves may have served as primitive currency.

An analysis of wear traces on carnelian and agate beads crafted by the Varna culture found evidence for the use of "some sort of fast or lap wheel" in their production.

== Burial rites ==
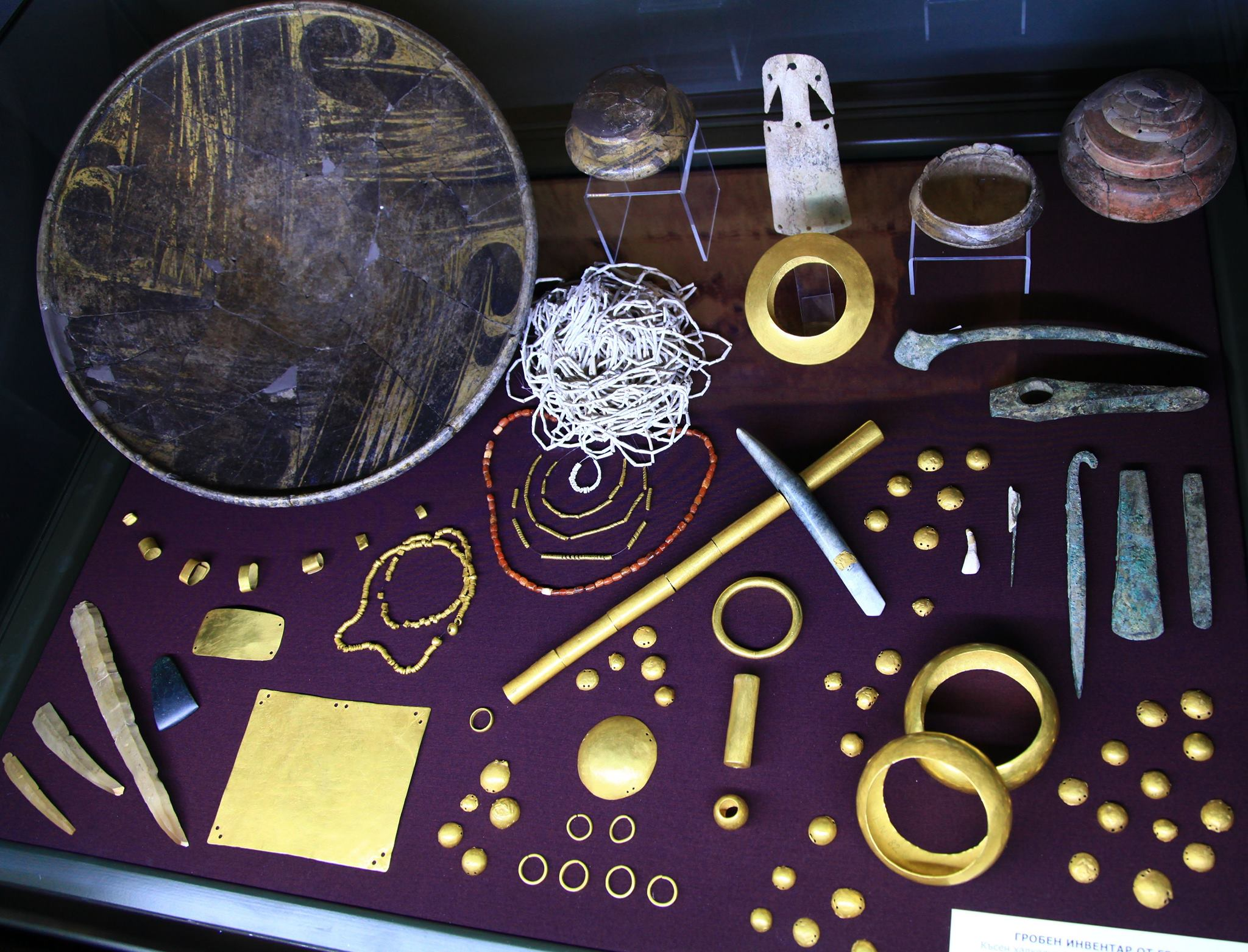
Artefacts from the Varna necropolis

Graves of the Varna Necropolis contained the oldest known examples of gold working in the world. Burials included both crouched and extended inhumations. Some graves did not contain a skeleton, only grave gifts. These symbolic (empty) graves are the richest in gold artifacts. 3,000 gold artifacts were found altogether, with a weight of approximately 6 kilograms. Three symbolic graves also contained masks of unfired clay.

"Varna is the oldest cemetery yet found where humans were buried with abundant golden ornaments. … The weight and the number of gold finds in the Varna cemetery exceeds by several times the combined weight and number of all of the gold artifacts found in all excavated sites of the same millenium, 5000-4000 BC, from all over the world, including Mesopotamia and Egypt. … Three graves contained gold objects that together accounted for more than half of the total weight of all gold grave goods yielded by the cemetery. A scepter, symbol of a supreme secular or religious authority, was discovered in each of these three graves." (Slavchev 2010)

== Metaphysical beliefs ==
The Varna culture believed in the afterlife and developed hierarchical status differences. It has the oldest known burial evidence of an elite male (Grave 43). Some authors have described the Varna elite males as 'kings'. The end of the fifth millennium BC is the time that Marija Gimbutas, who has postulated the Kurgan hypothesis, claims the cultural descent into male dominance began in Europe. The high status male was buried with remarkable amounts of gold, held a war axe or mace and wore a gold penis sheath or possibly a decorative (gold) belt tip. The bull-shaped gold platelets perhaps also venerated virility, instinctive force, warfare and a proto-castle cult.

== Genetics ==
The elite male from Grave 43 (c. 4495 BC) belonged to the paternal (Y-DNA) haplogroup T-M184 and the maternal (mtDNA) haplogroup U2. Other male samples from the Varna necropolis belonged to the Y-DNA haplogroups I2a1, I2a2, G2a, T1a, E1b1b and R1b-V88.

== Gallery ==
=== Artefacts ===
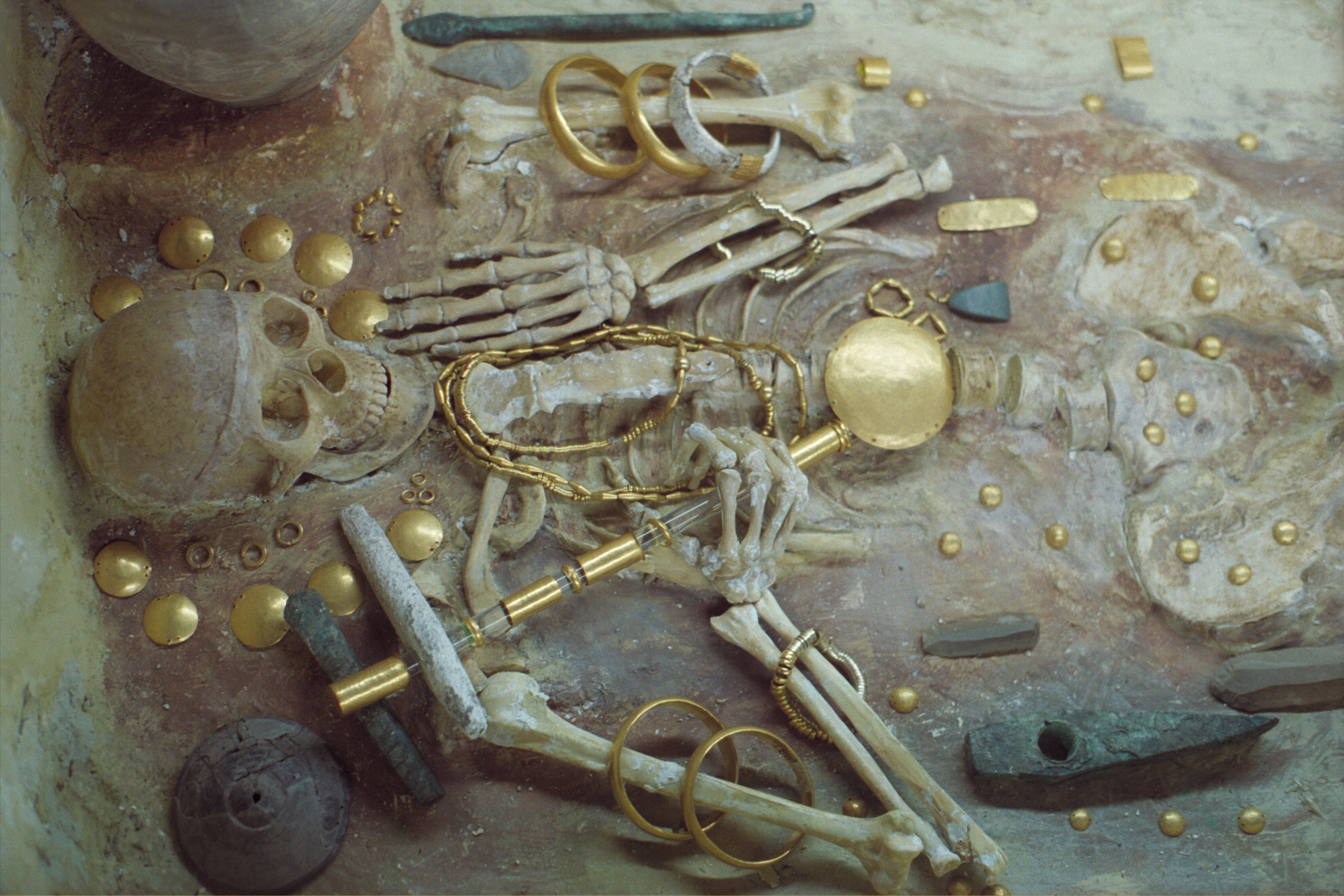

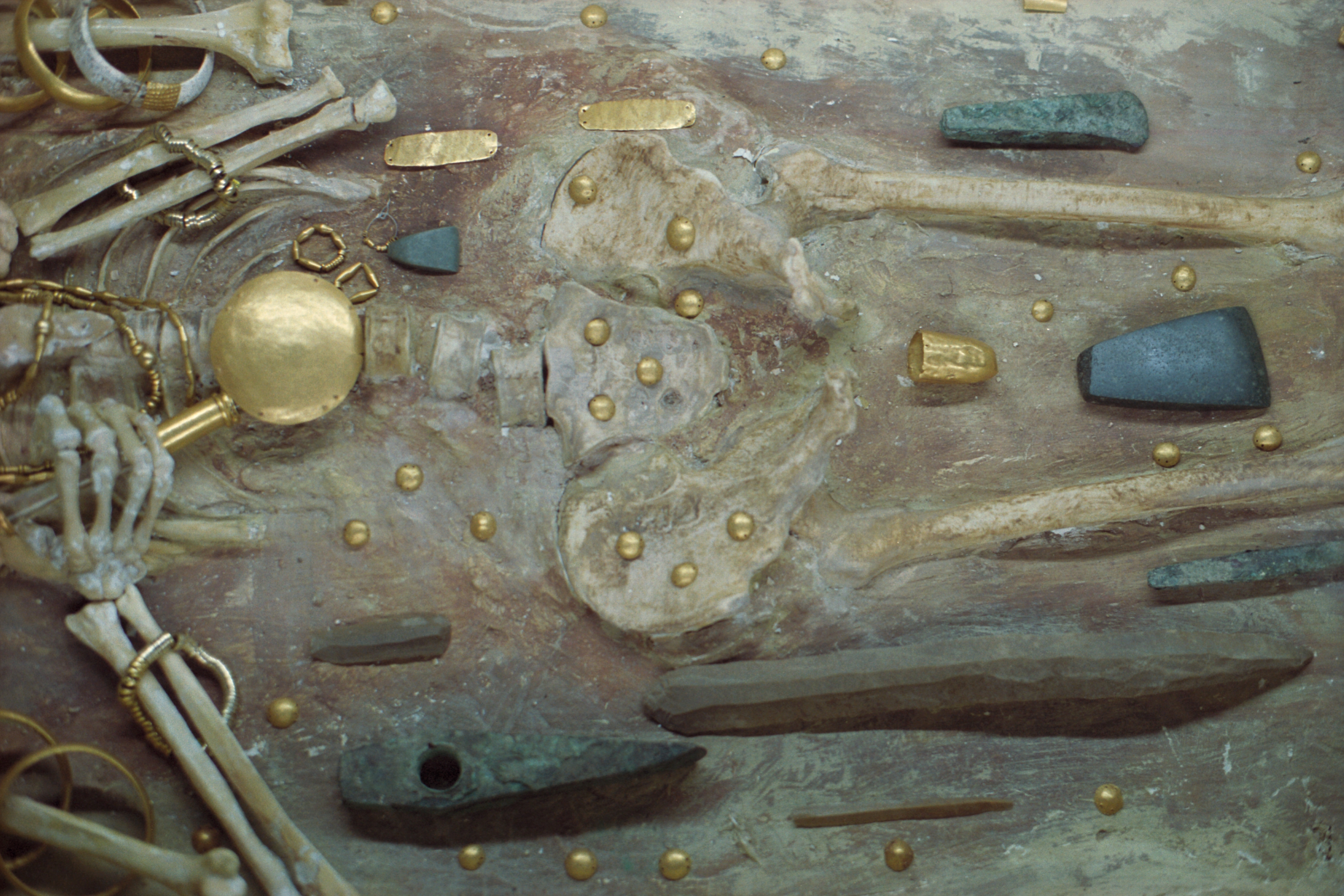

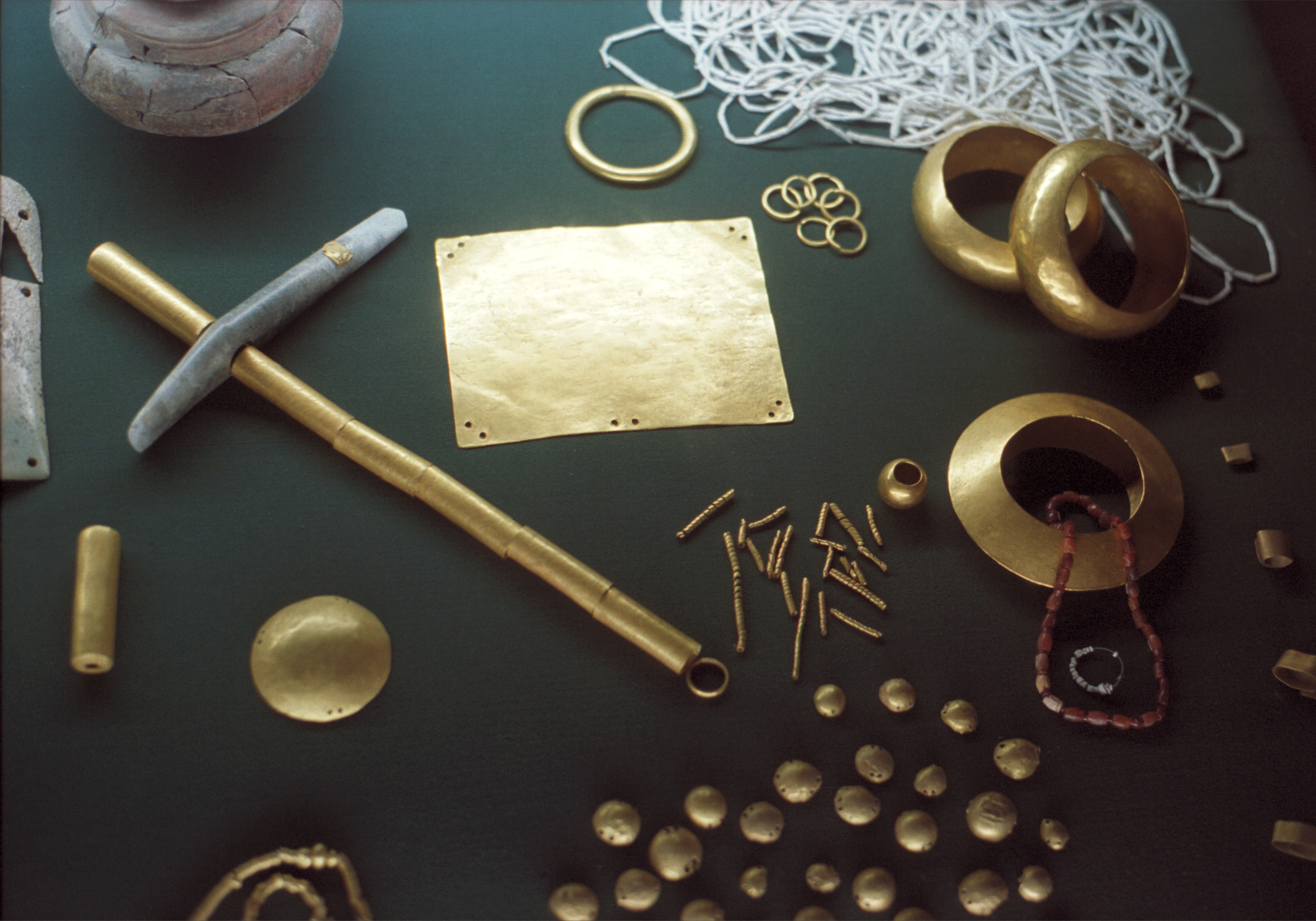

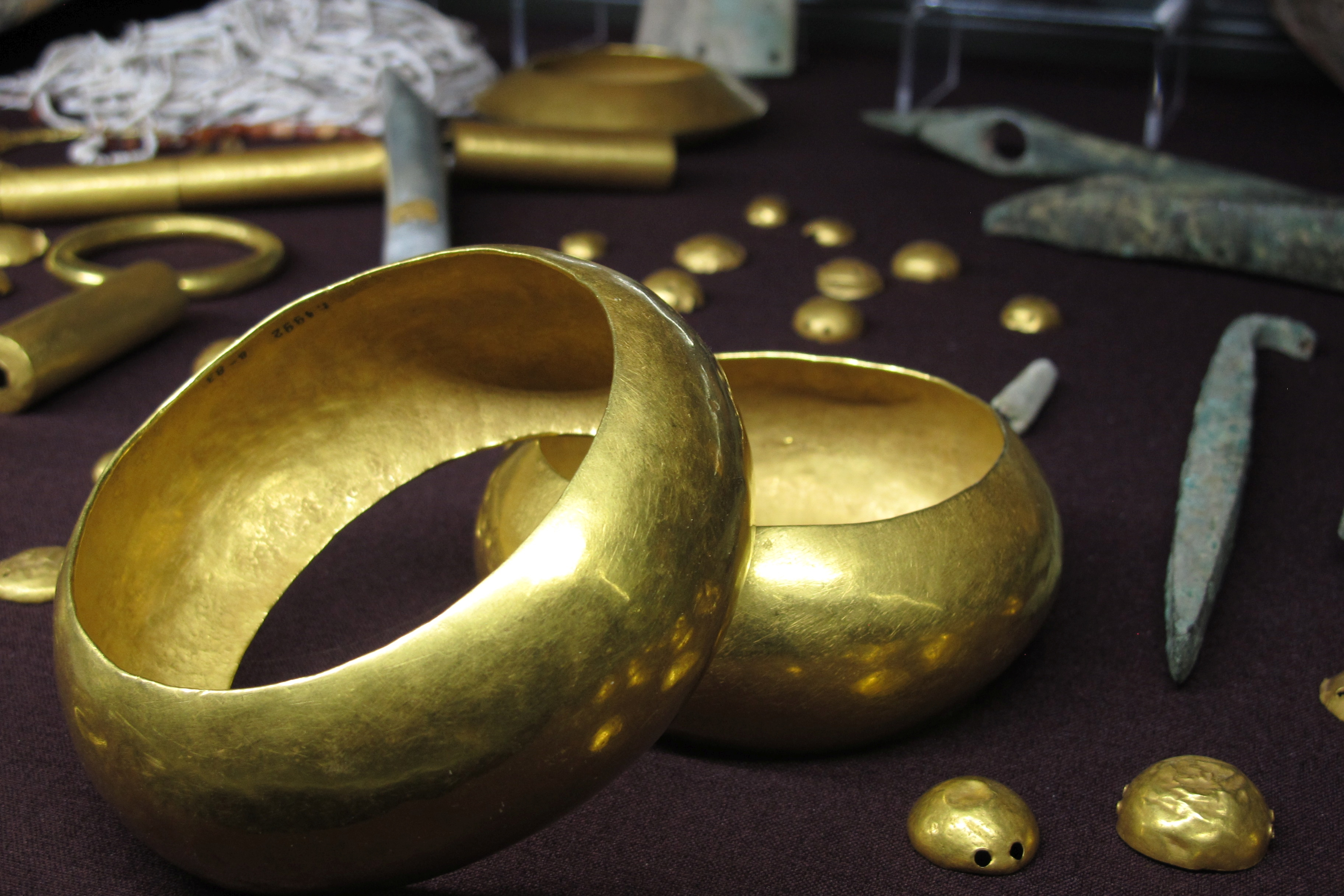

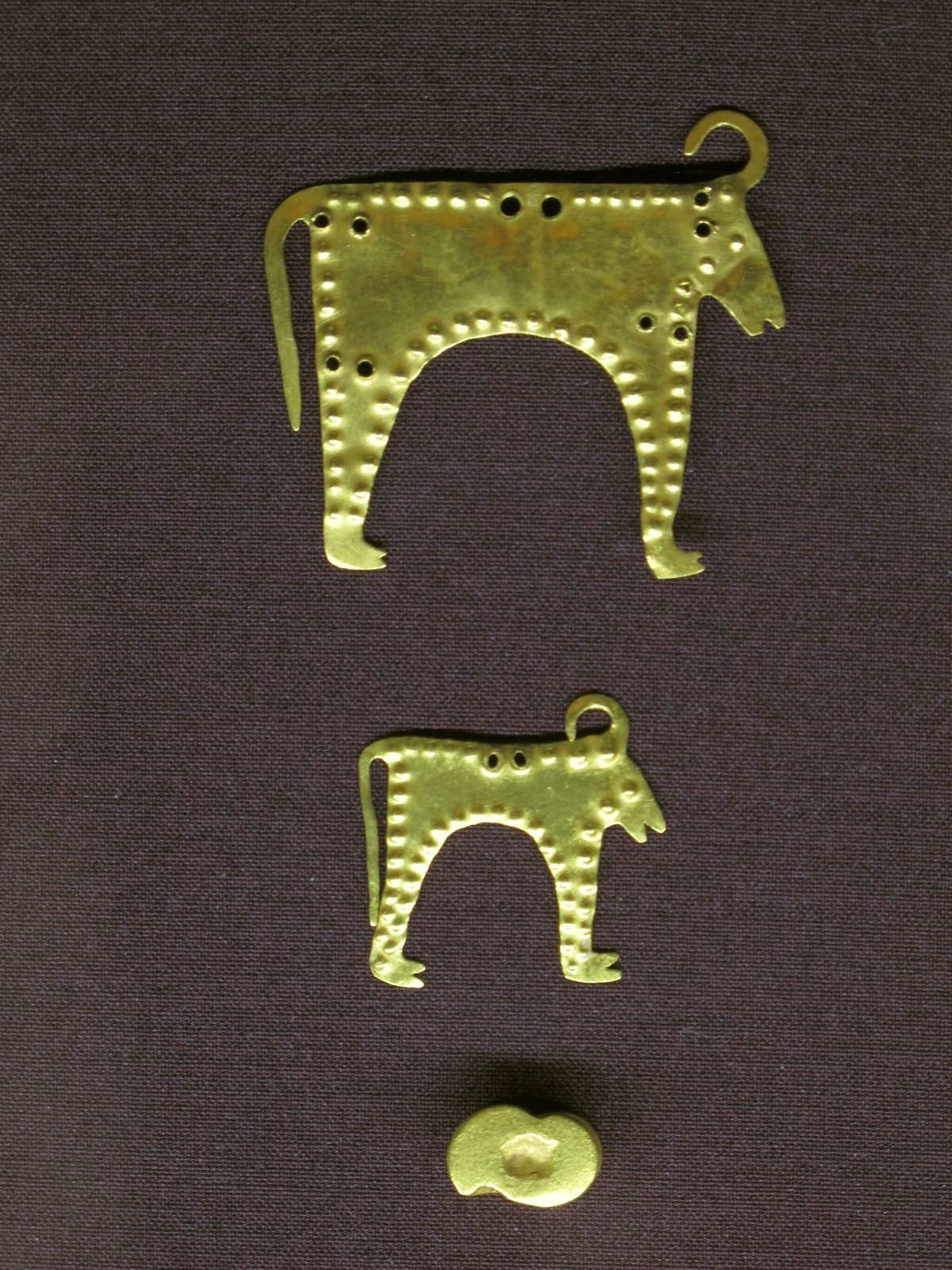

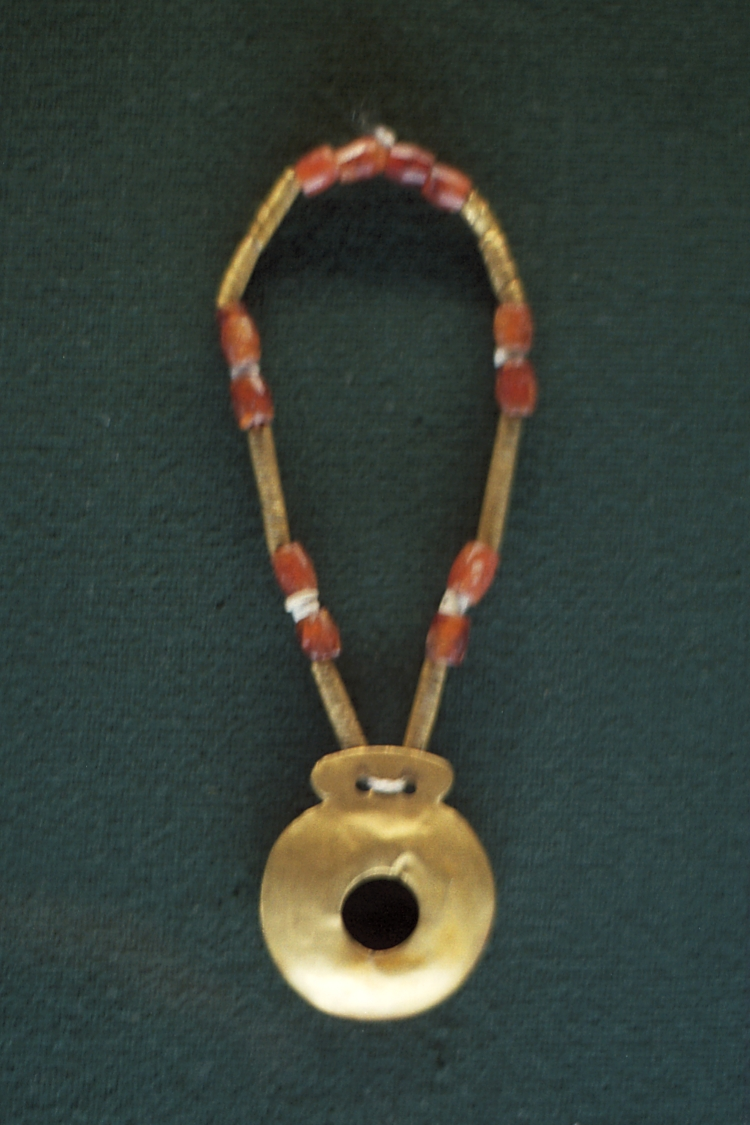

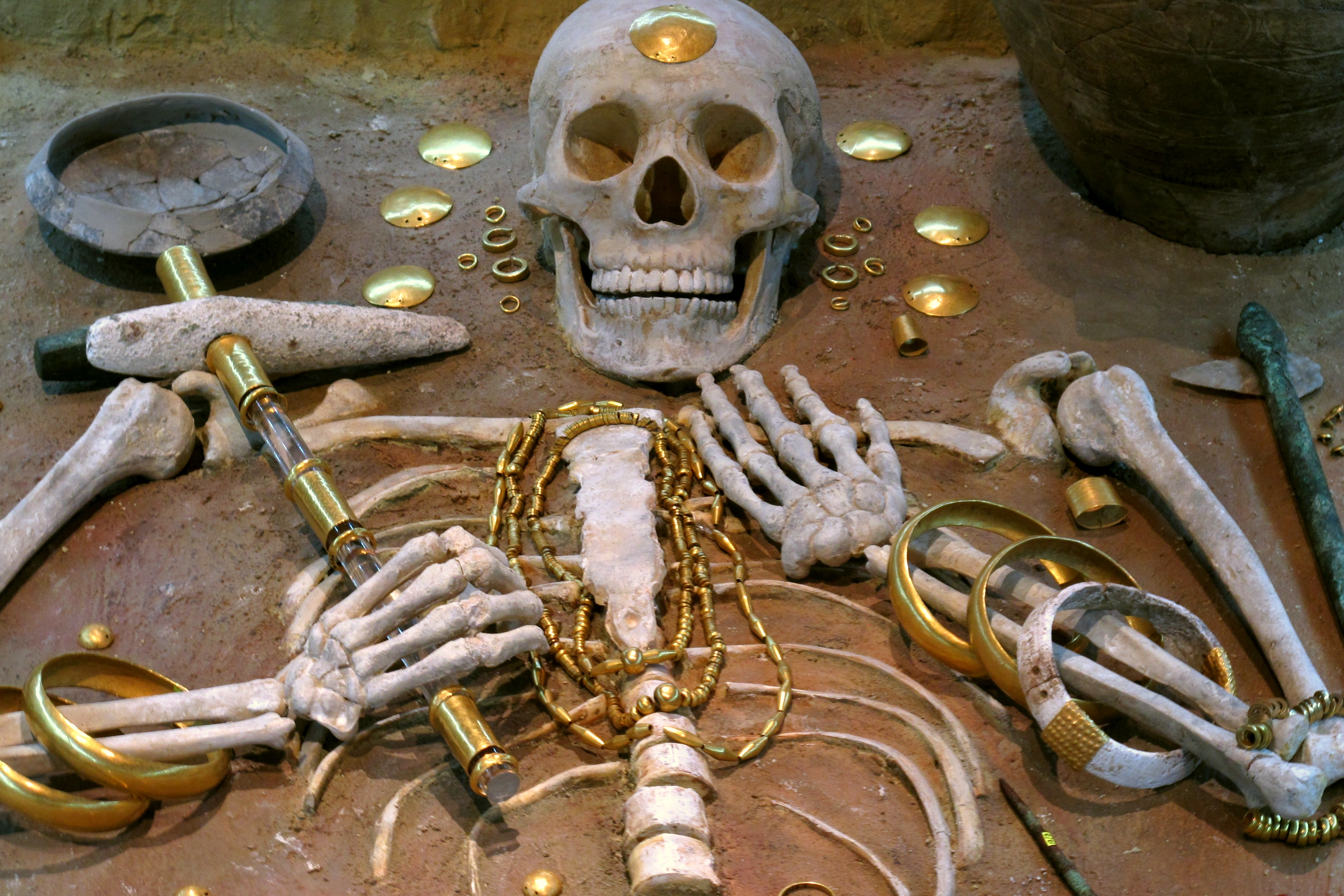

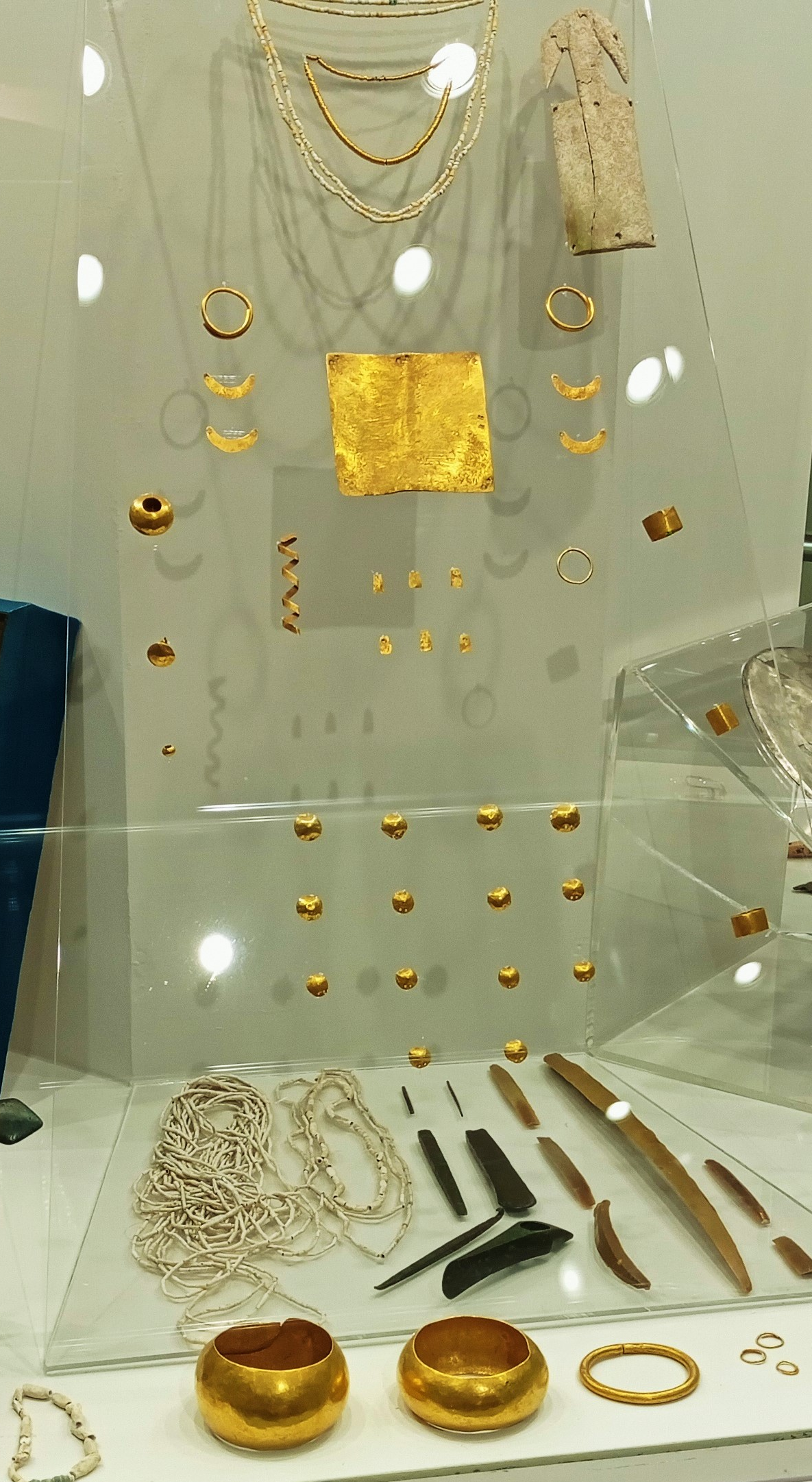

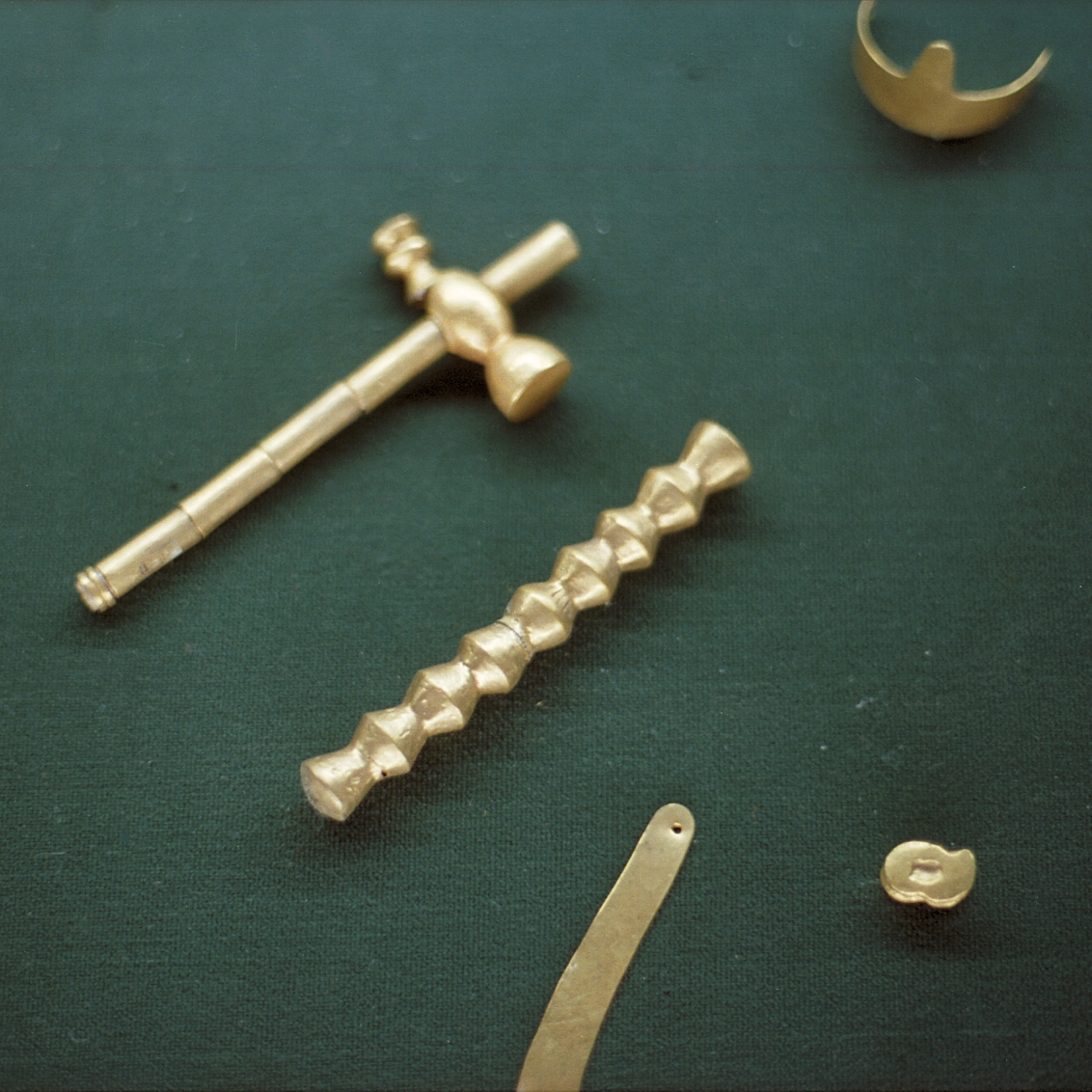

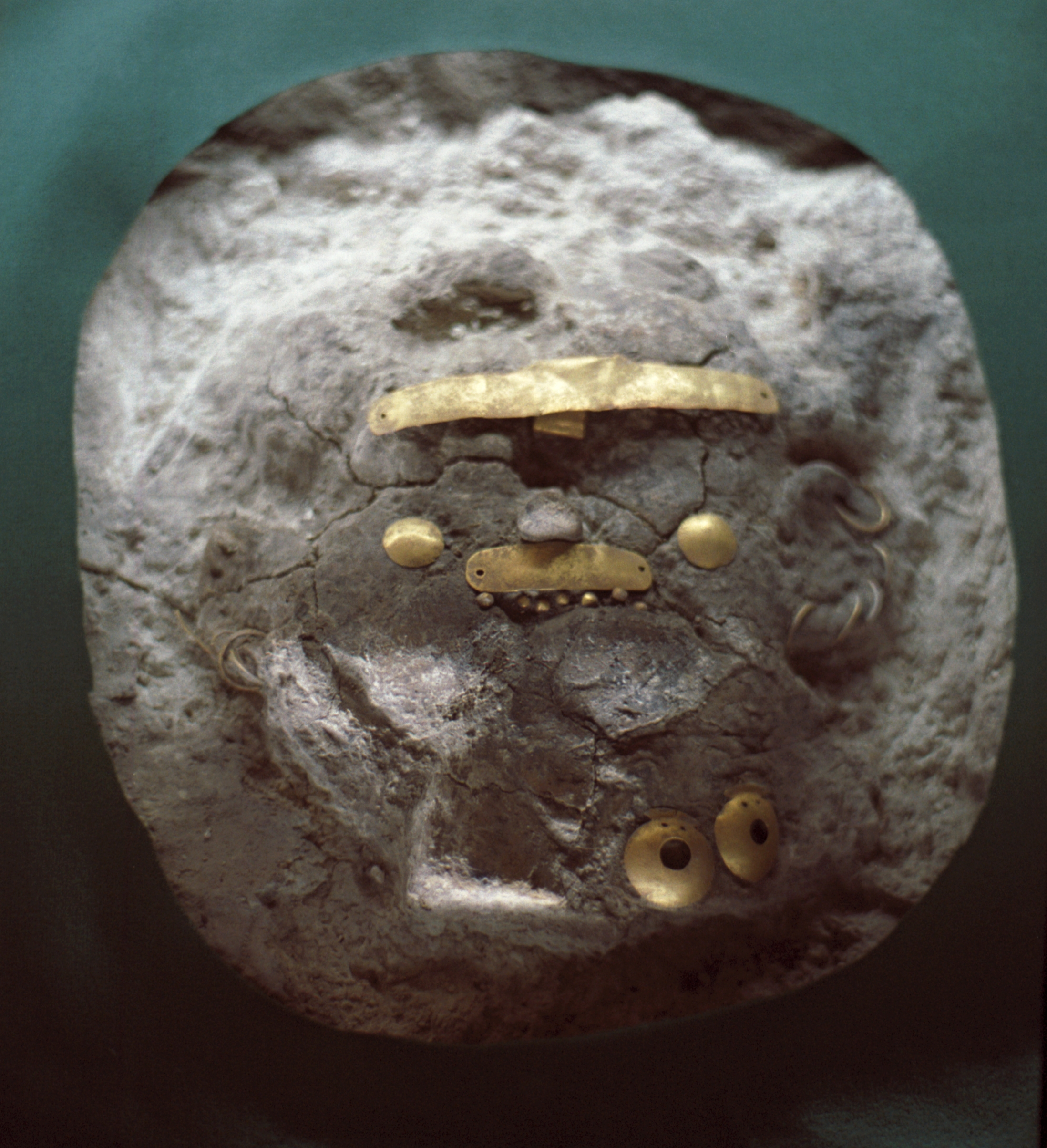

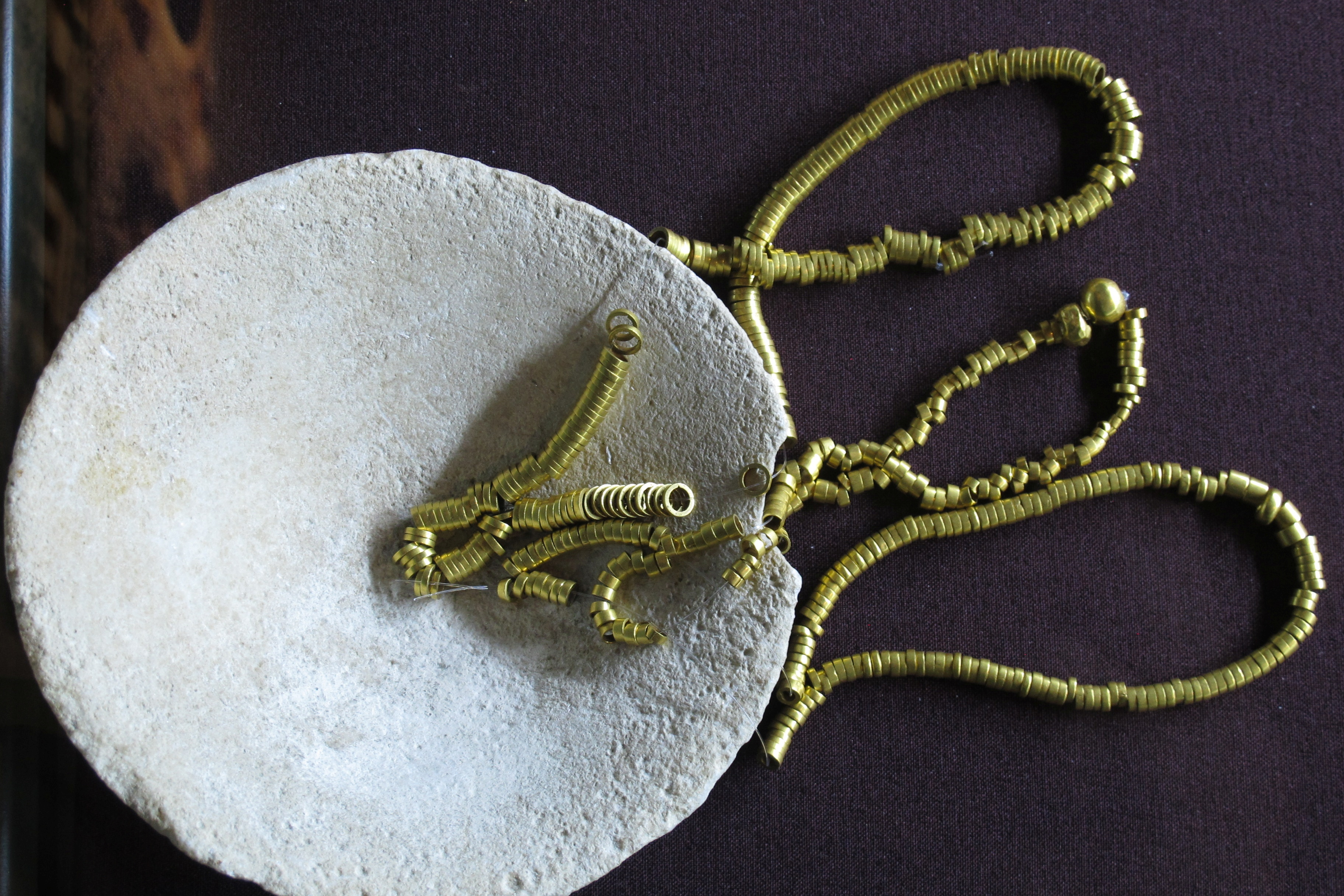

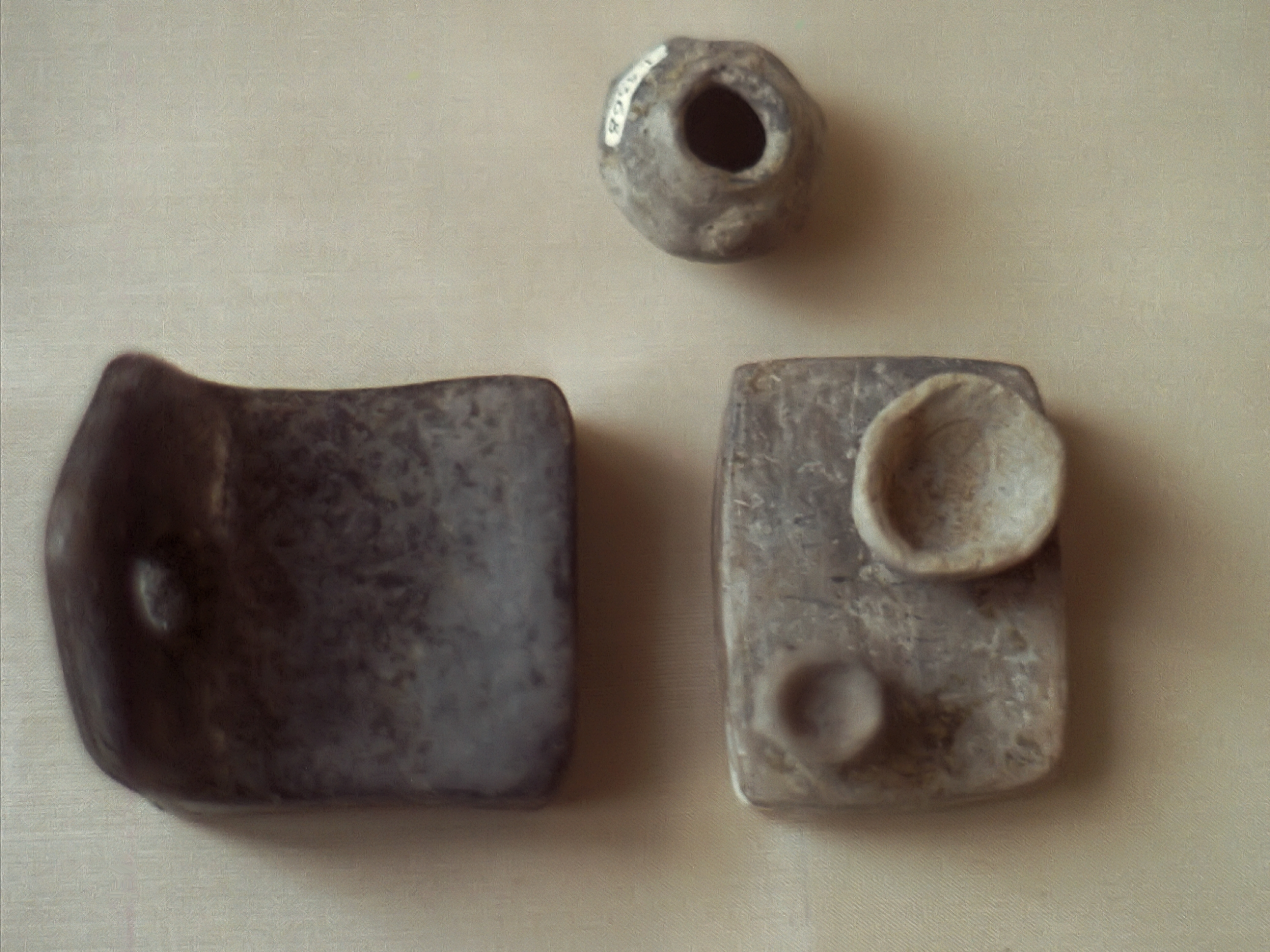

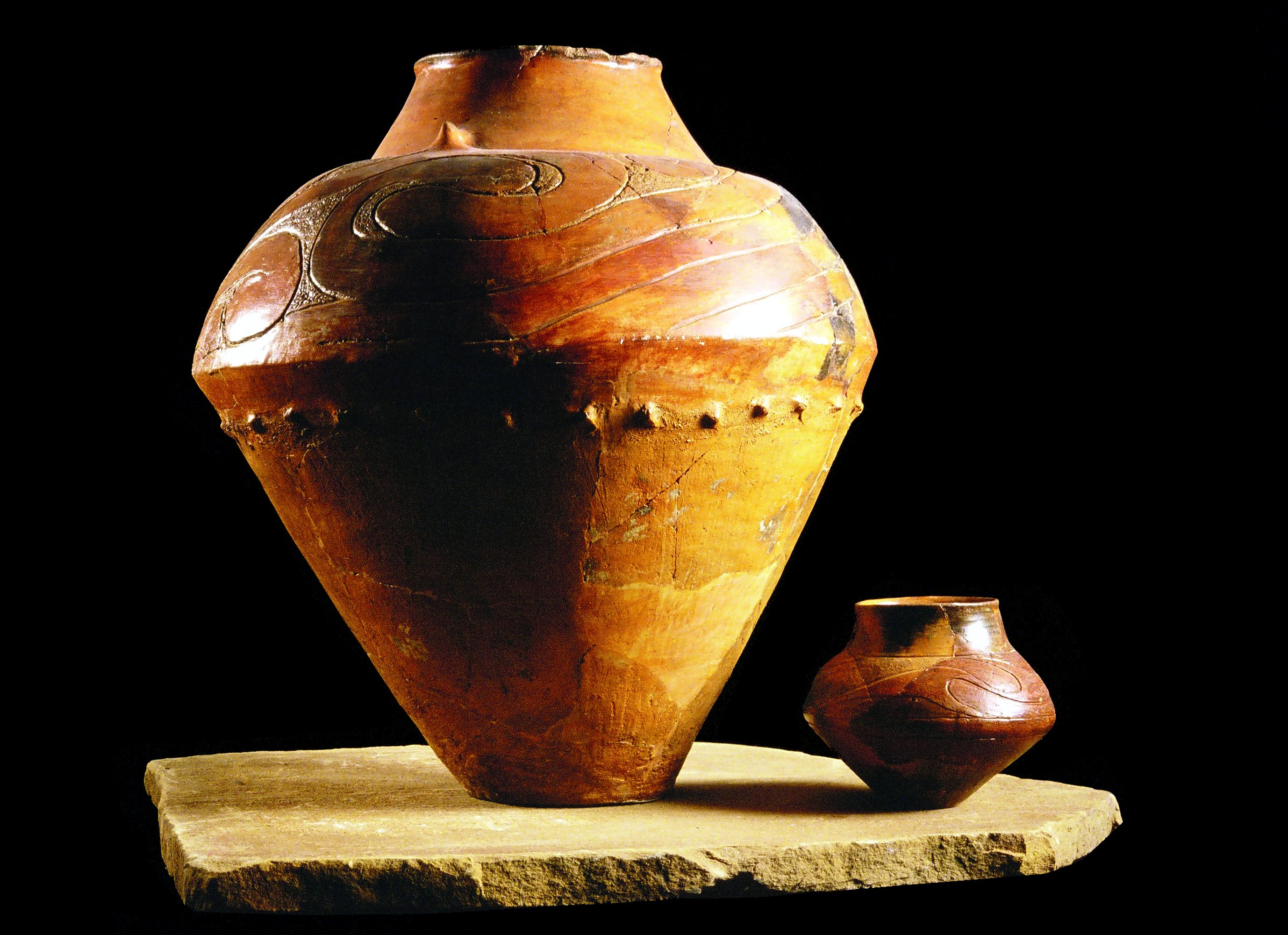
Eneolithic ceramic vessels from the Golemja Ostrov Tell near Durankulak (RIM-Dobrich)

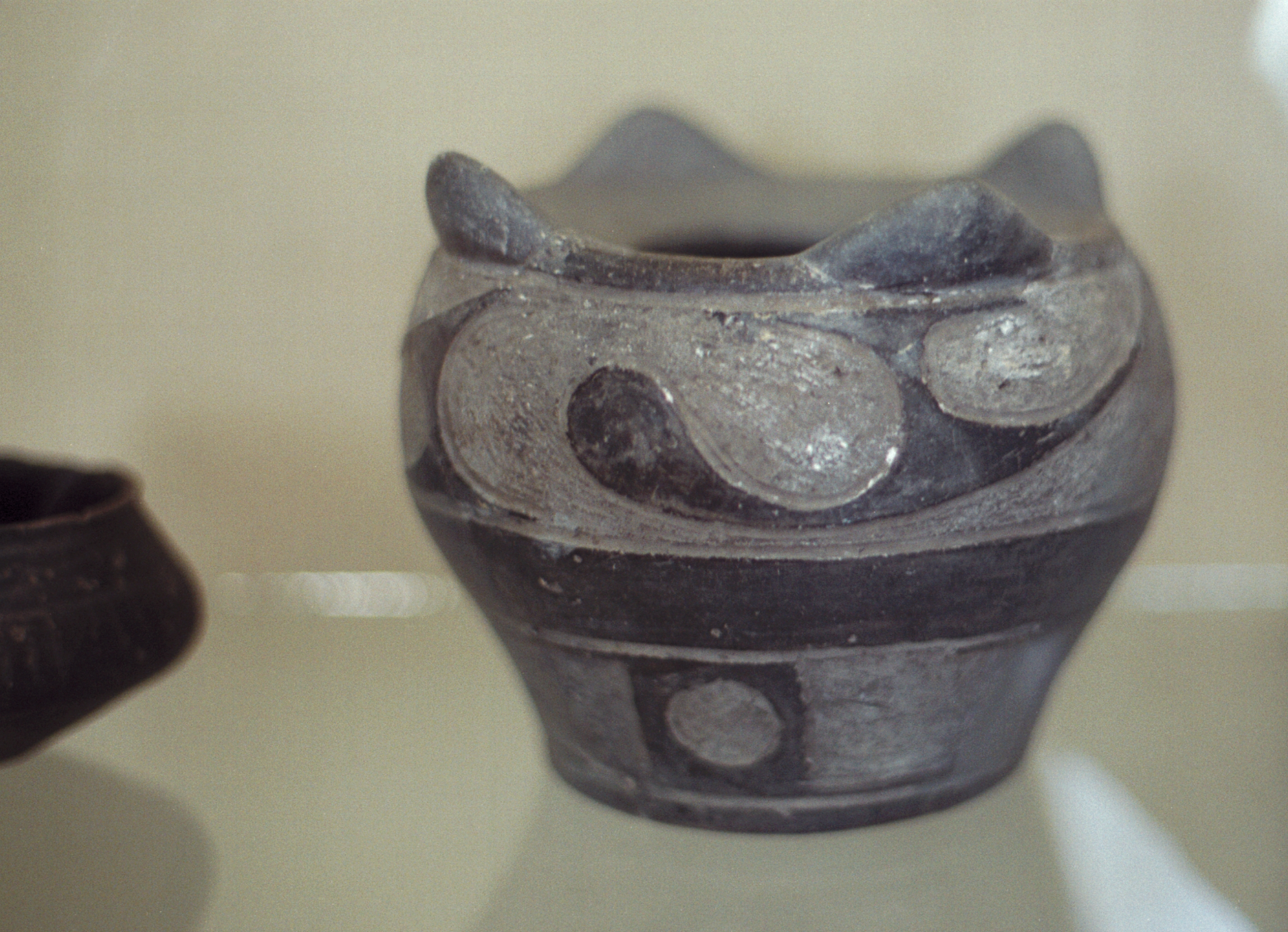
Ceramic vessel from the necropolis at Durankulak, late Chalcolithic, Varna culture

=== Settlements ===
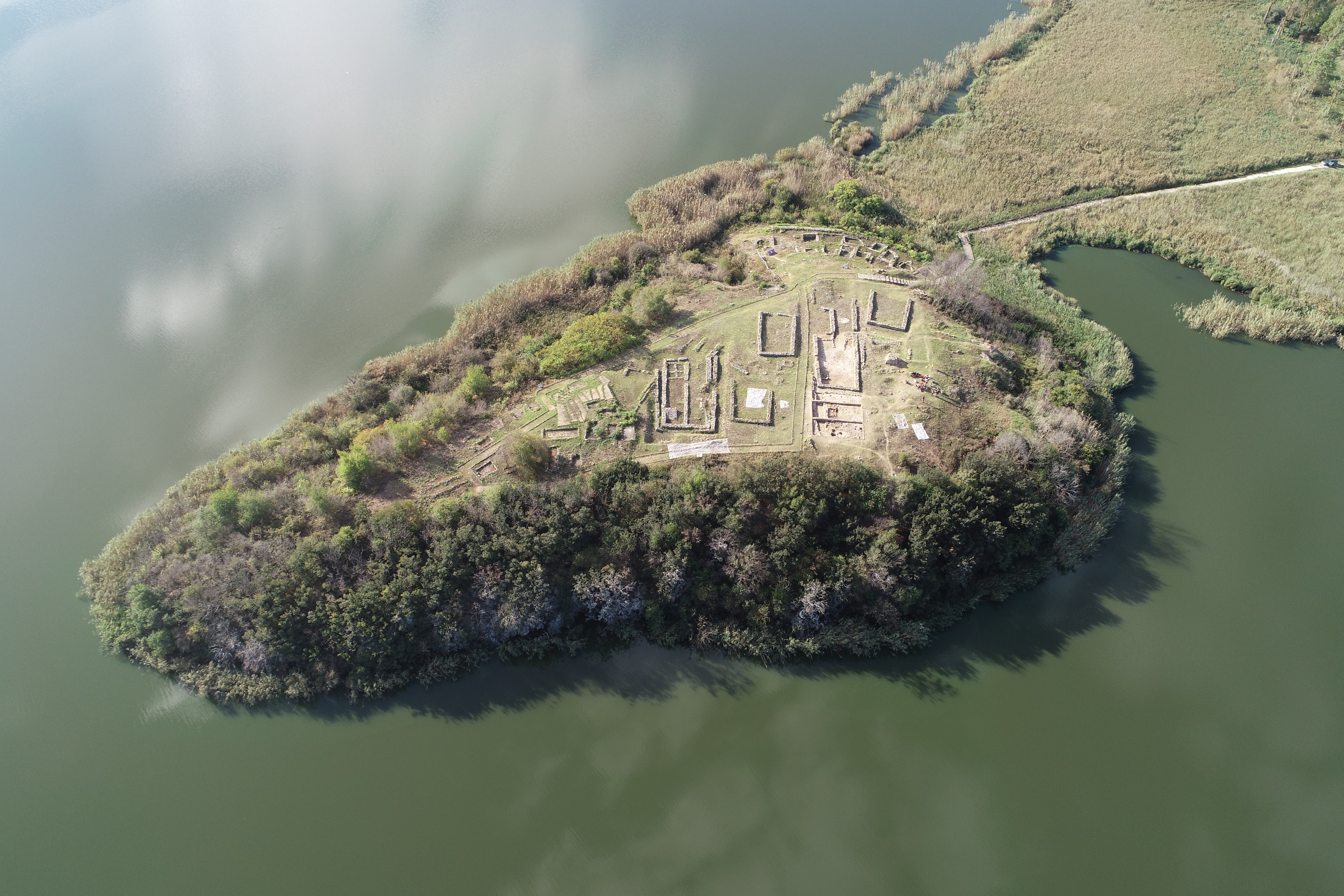
Durankulak, Bulgaria

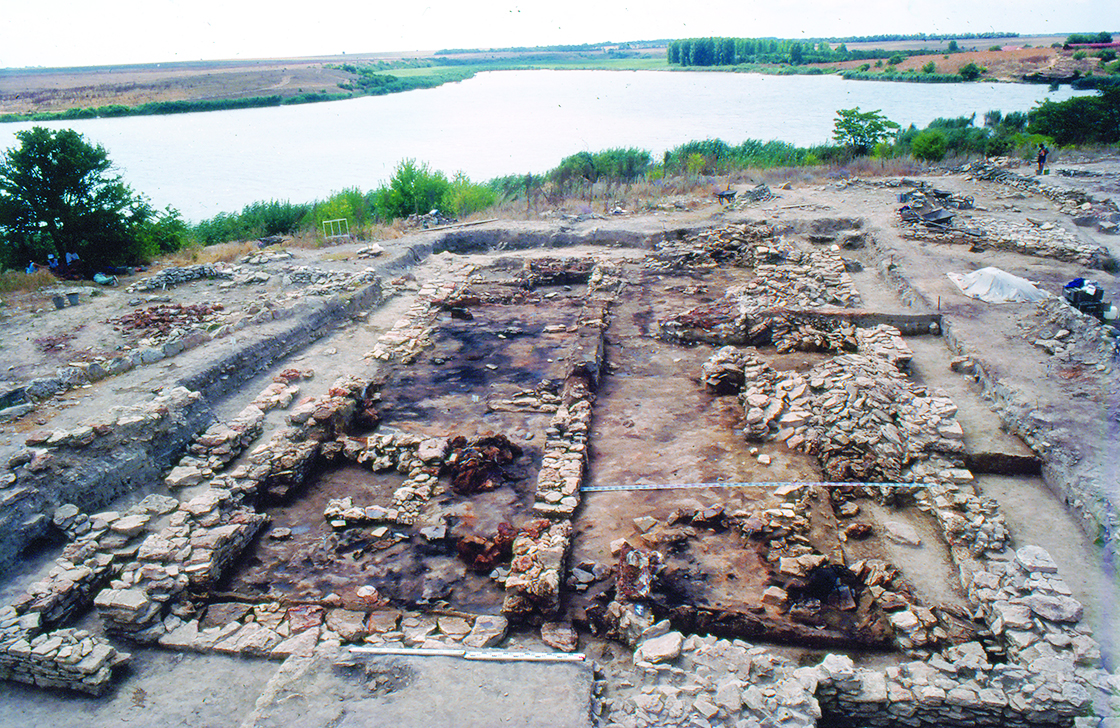
Durankulak, stone foundations

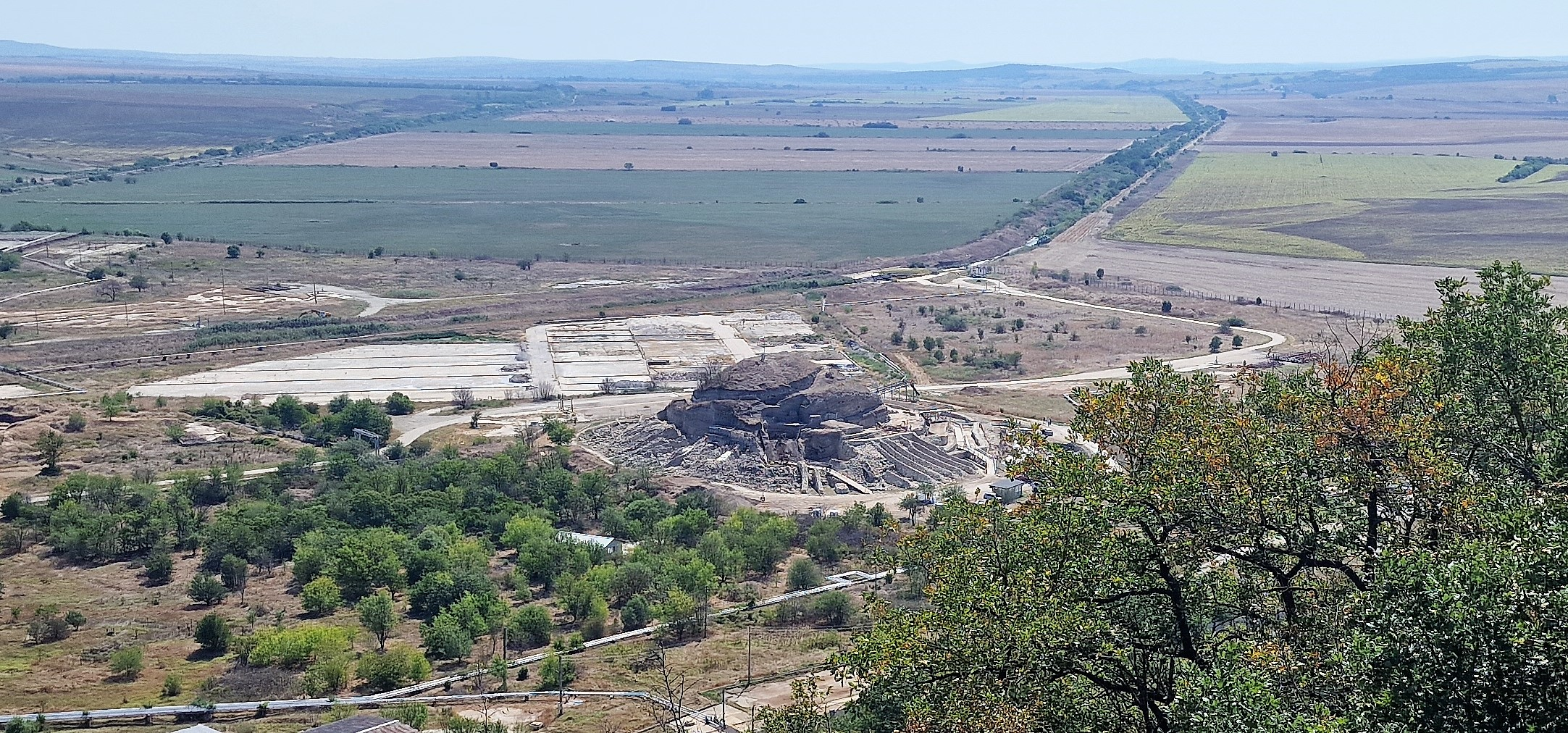
Site of the Solnitsata walled settlement

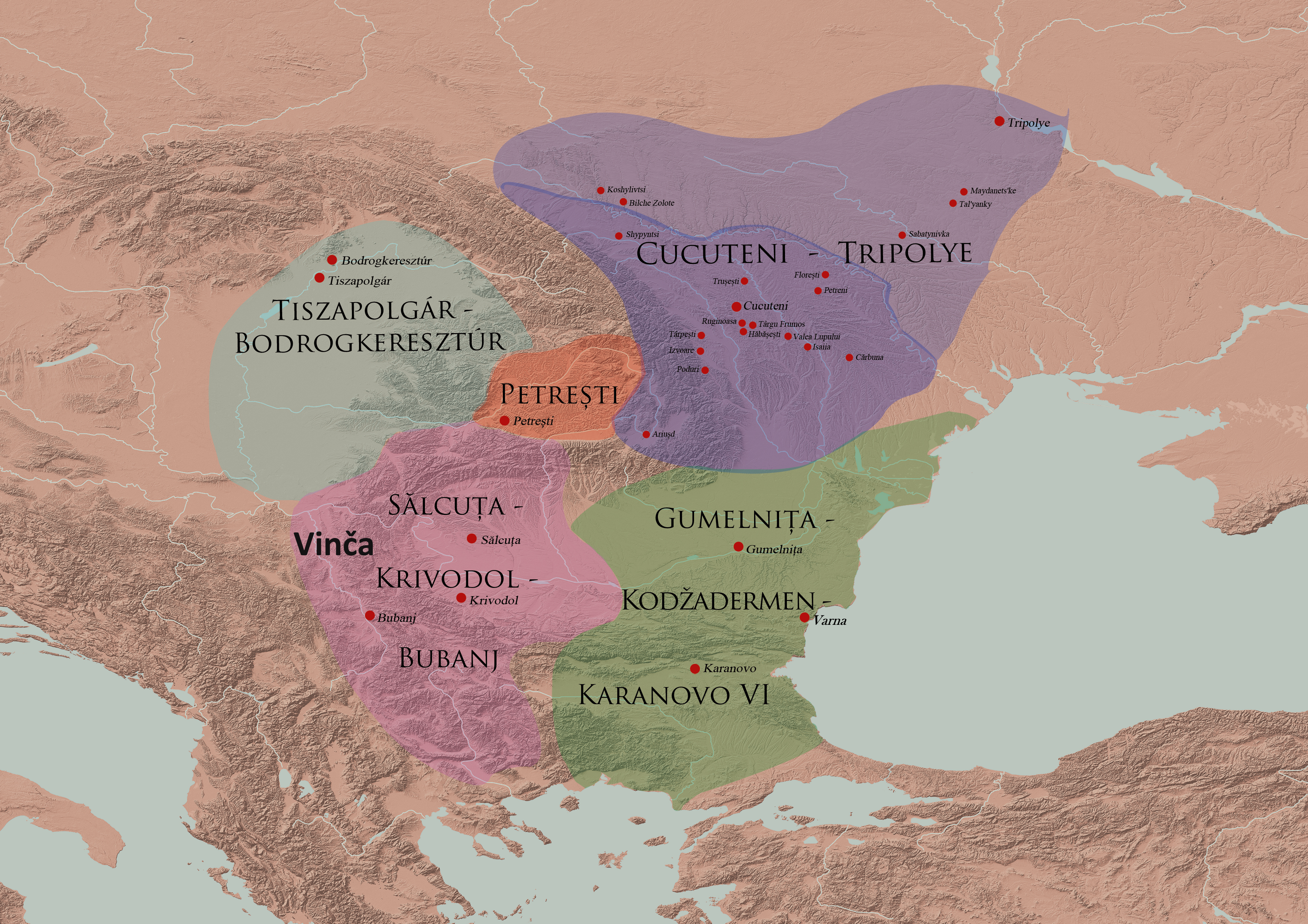
Chalcolithic cultures of 'Old Europe'

== See also ==
- Early European Farmers
- Old Europe (archaeology)
- Boian culture
- Butmir Culture
- Cucuteni–Trypillia culture
- Funnelbeaker culture
- Hamangia culture
- Karanovo culture
- Gumelnița culture
- Lengyel culture
- Linear Pottery culture
- Sesklo culture
- Solnitsata
- Starčevo culture
- Tisza culture
- Vinča culture
- Old European script
- Carnac Stones – Tumuli
