= Durankulak (archaeological site) =

Archaeological site in Bulgaria

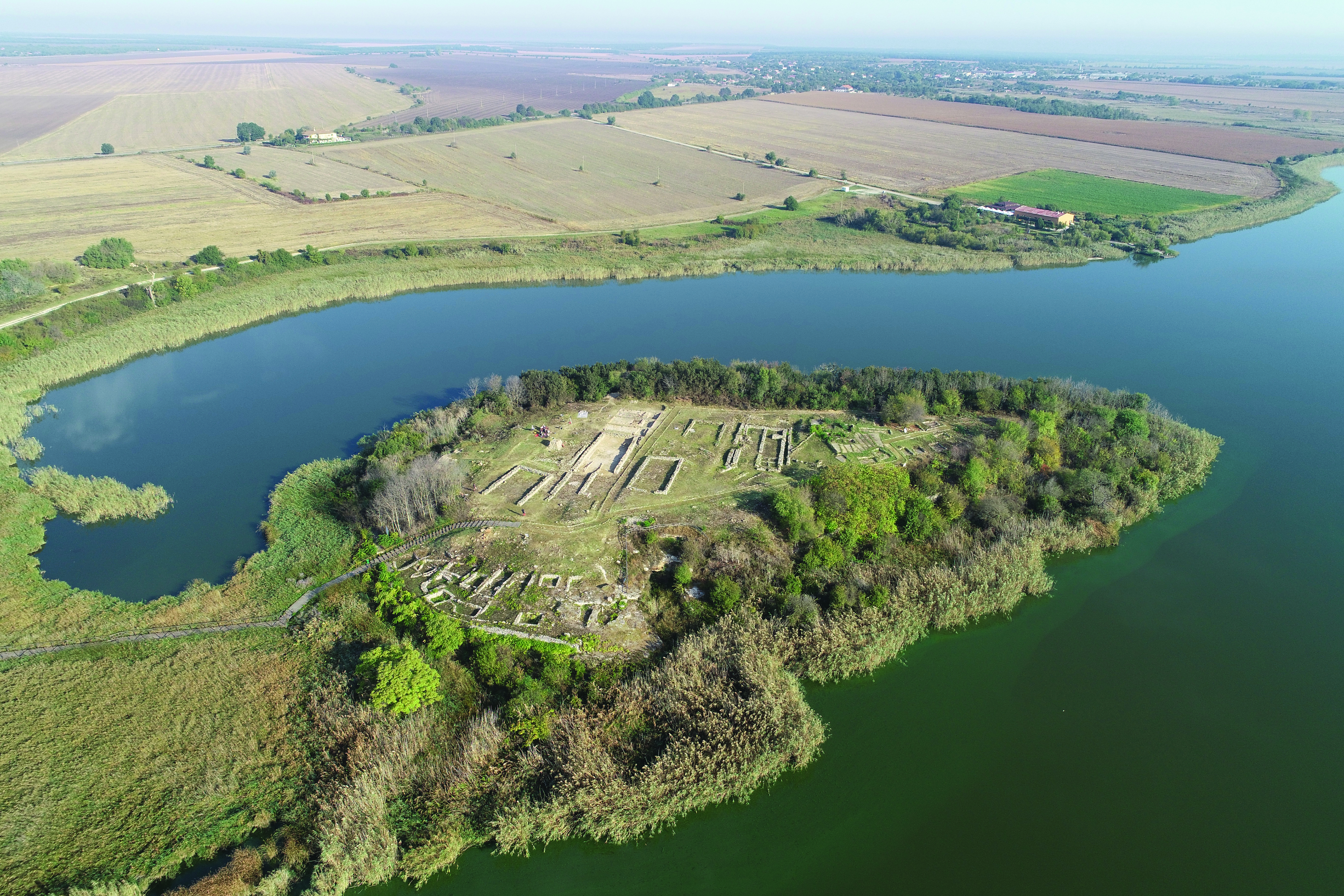
- Durankulak Golemija ostrov (Big Island) tell

- Location within Bulgaria
- 43°40′10″N 28°31′57″E
- Type: Prehistoric settlement
- Periods: Neolithic, Chalcolithic, Old Europe, Bronze Age, Antiquity, Middle Ages
- Cultures: Hamangia culture (proto civilization), Varna culture
- Location: Durankulak, Bulgaria
- Region: Dobrich Province

History
- Built: 5th millennium BC
- Abandoned: 10th century AD

Site notes
- Material: Stone
- Area: 1.5 km^{2} (0.58 sq mi)
- Excavation dates: 1974—2025
- Archaeologists: Henrieta Todorova, Ivan Vajsov, Vladimir Slavcev, Todor Dimov
- Condition: Ruins
- Management: Municipality of Stabla
- Website: Archaeological Complex "Durankulak-Hamangia"

Durankulak is a prehistoric archaeological site on the Big Island (Golemiya ostrov) in Durankulak lake, Bulgaria. Prehistoric settlement commenced on the small island approximately 7000 BP and lasted for thousands of years.

== History ==
=== Neolithic ===
The first inhabitants were the Hamangia culture, dated from the middle of the 6th millennium to the middle of 5th millennium BC, and were the first manifestation of the Neolithic life in Dobrudja. Hamangia people were small-scale cultivators and plant collectors who built houses, made pottery, herded and hunted animals. Around 4700/4600 BC the stone architecture was already in general use and became a characteristic phenomenon in the settlement that was unique in Europe. Durankulak lake was a well-organized aggregation of buildings of substantial size with several rooms. They were coherently laid out according to a plan that was repeated over successive generations of house reconstructions. Buildings were rectilinear and large, narrow paths separated individual houses, which stood alone or abutted by other buildings. The structures were robust and made of large wooden posts sunk into foundation trenches and joined with wooden planks or branches covered with mud or clay. In all building horizons, except for in the earliest ones, buildings were internally divided into separate, mainly rectilinear, rooms. Stone structures and bases from the houses are well preserved and there is a cave and some cisterns to see. Durankulak is one of few monuments left from early farming societies in Europe and tell us about daily life. The excavation in Durankulak took part between 1974 and 1997 when 1204 prehistoric burials were carefully recorded and the remains of 25 houses were found.

== Gallery ==
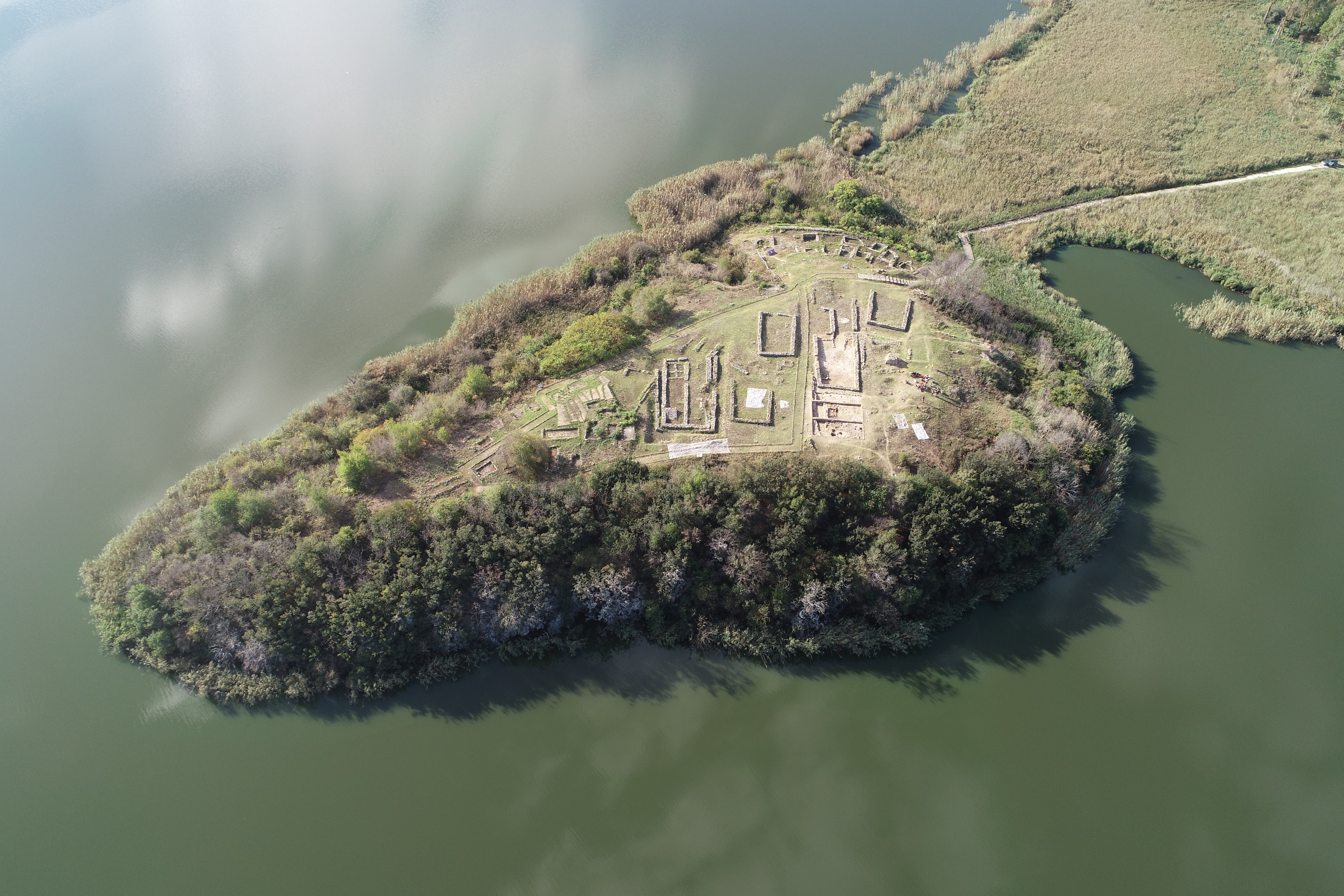
Golemija ostrov tell (Big Island) and the Archeological site. The first stone architecture in continental Europe (4500 BC)

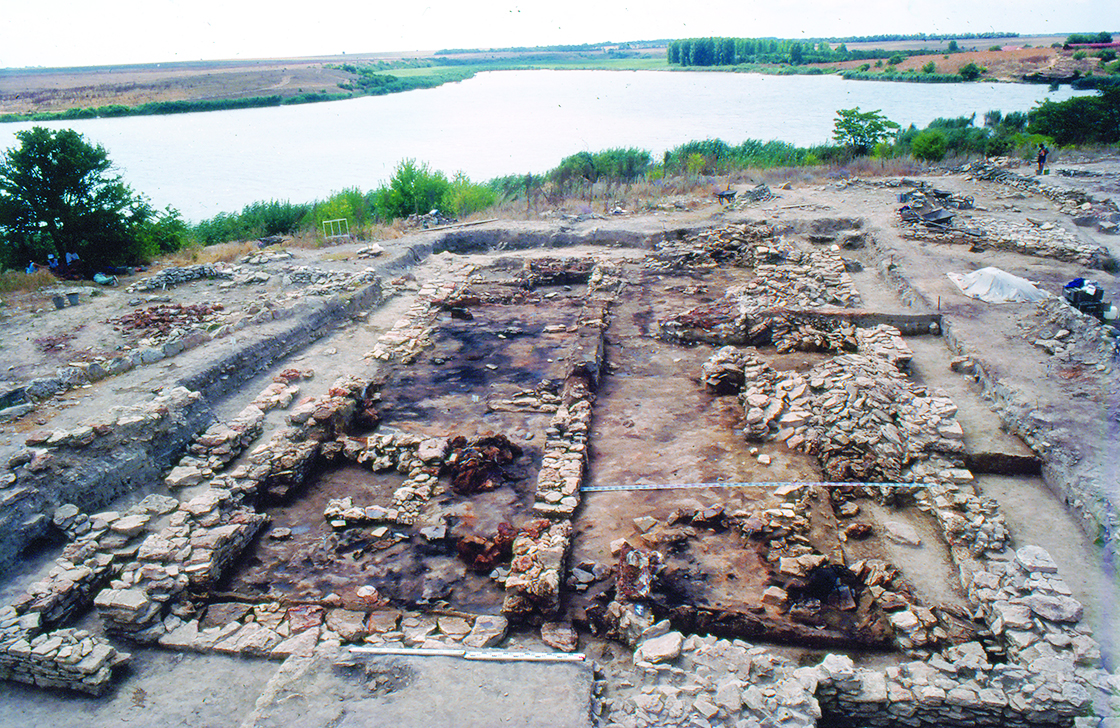
Durankulak, eneolithic stone foundations

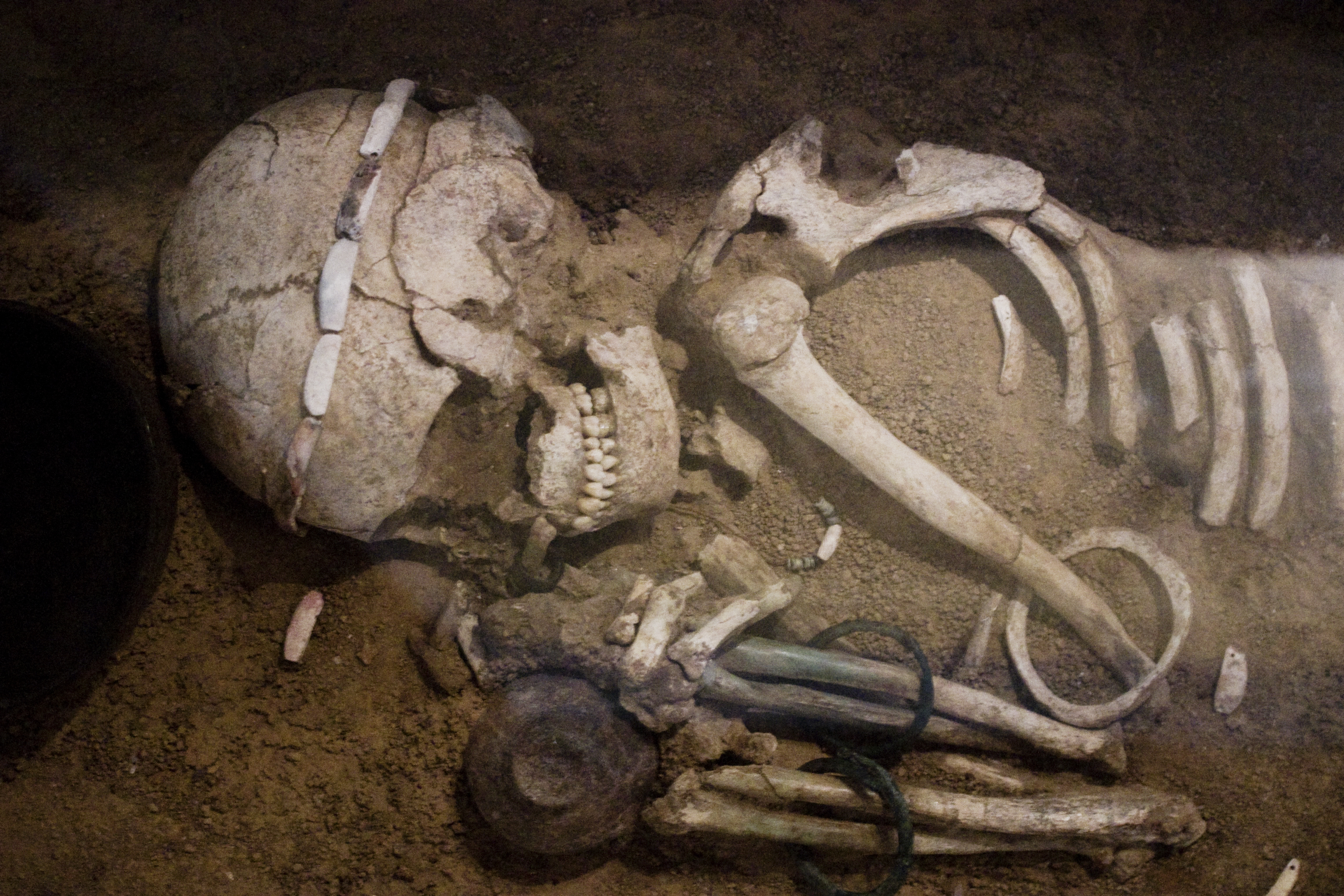
Burial at the Durankulak necropolis

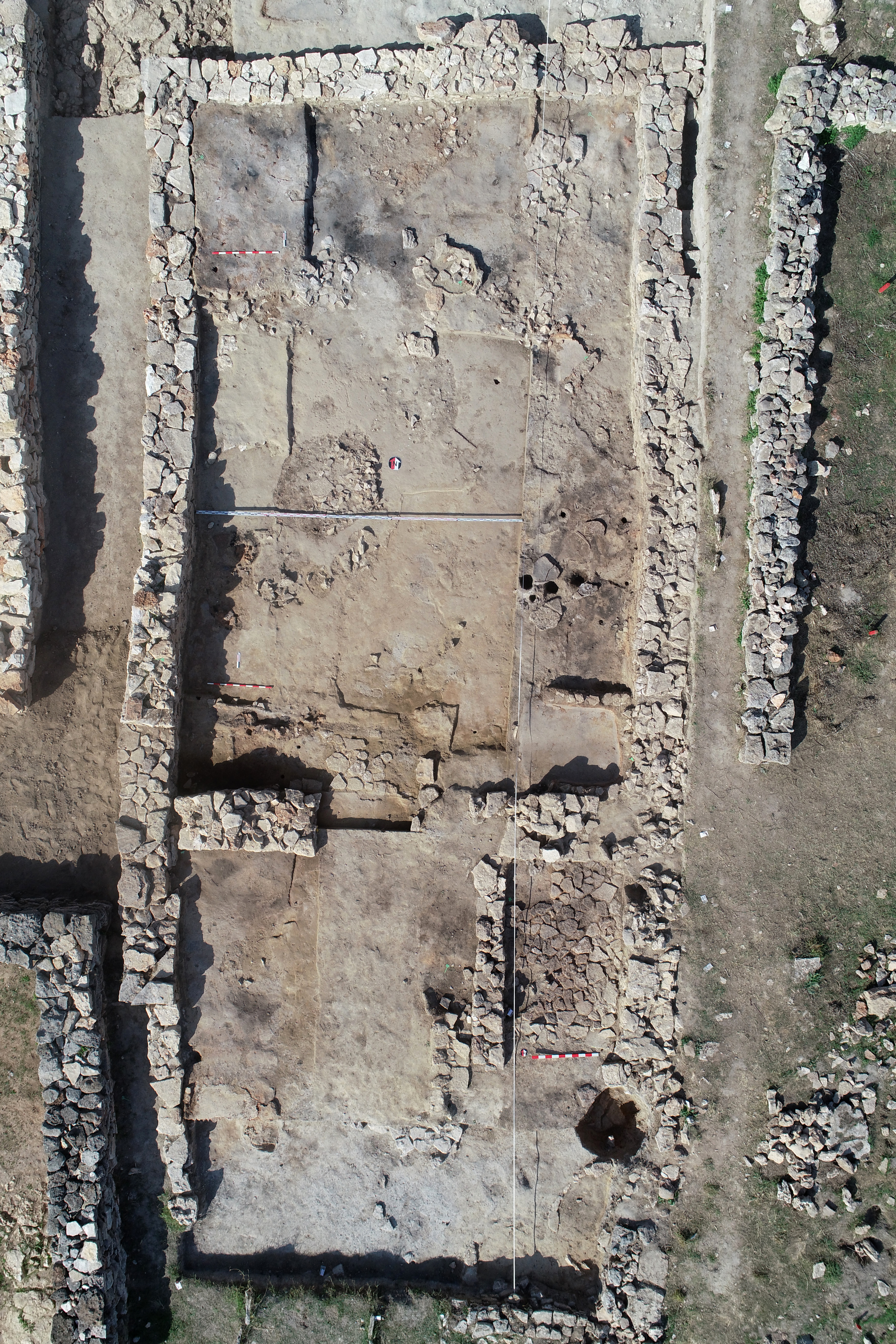
Building No. 24/VII – Hamangia IV culture. Aerial Photography 2022

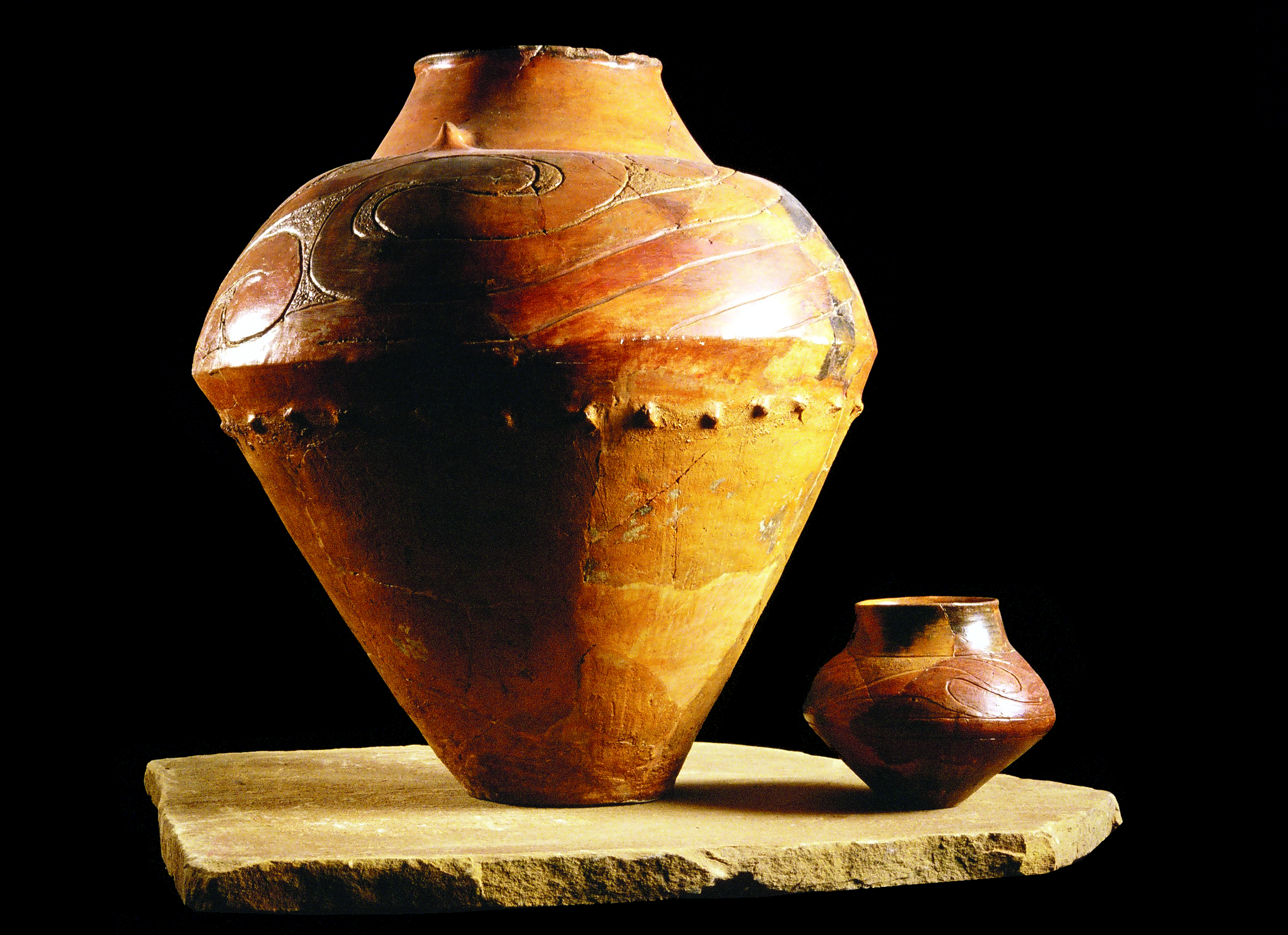

== See also ==
- List of ancient cities in Thrace and Dacia
- Hamangia culture
- Karanovo culture
- Perperikon
- Seuthopolis
- Tell Yunatsite
- Old Europe
- Varna culture
