= Solnitsata =

Prehistoric town in present-day Bulgaria

- Солницата (Bulgarian)
- Location in Bulgaria
- 43.1284°N 27.4725°E
- Type: Settlement
- Periods: Neolithic, Chalcolithic
- Cultures: Karanovo culture, Hamangia culture, Varna culture, Gumelnița–Karanovo culture
- Location: Varna, Bulgaria

History
- Built: c. 4700 BC
- Abandoned: c. 4200 BC

Site notes
- Condition: ruins
- Website: https://provadia-solnitsata.com/en

Solnitsata (Bulgarian: Солницата, "The Saltworks") was a prehistoric town located in present-day Bulgaria, near the modern city of Provadia. It is the oldest salt production center in continental Europe (5500‑4200 BC). It was the first prehistoric urban center in Europe. Solnitsata was a fortified stone settlement - citadelle, inner and outer city with pottery production site and the site of a salt production facility; it flourished c. 4700–4200 BC. The settlement was walled to protect the salt, a crucial commodity in antiquity. Although its population has been estimated at only 350, Vassil Nikolov argues that it meets established criteria as a prehistoric proto-city.

Salt production drove Solnitsata's economy, and the town is believed to have supplied salt throughout the Balkans. A large collection of gold objects nearby has led archaeologists to consider that this trade resulted in great wealth for the town's residents — Varna Necropolis. Researchers suggest that some of the residential buildings in the settlement were two-story, a fact that indicates relatively advanced architectural planning in a prehistoric context. Nearby is the ancient Anhialos, whose livelihood was the extraction of sea salt. The extraction technology can be seen in the Salt Museum, Pomorie.

The town is believed to have been destroyed by an earthquake.

== Gallery ==
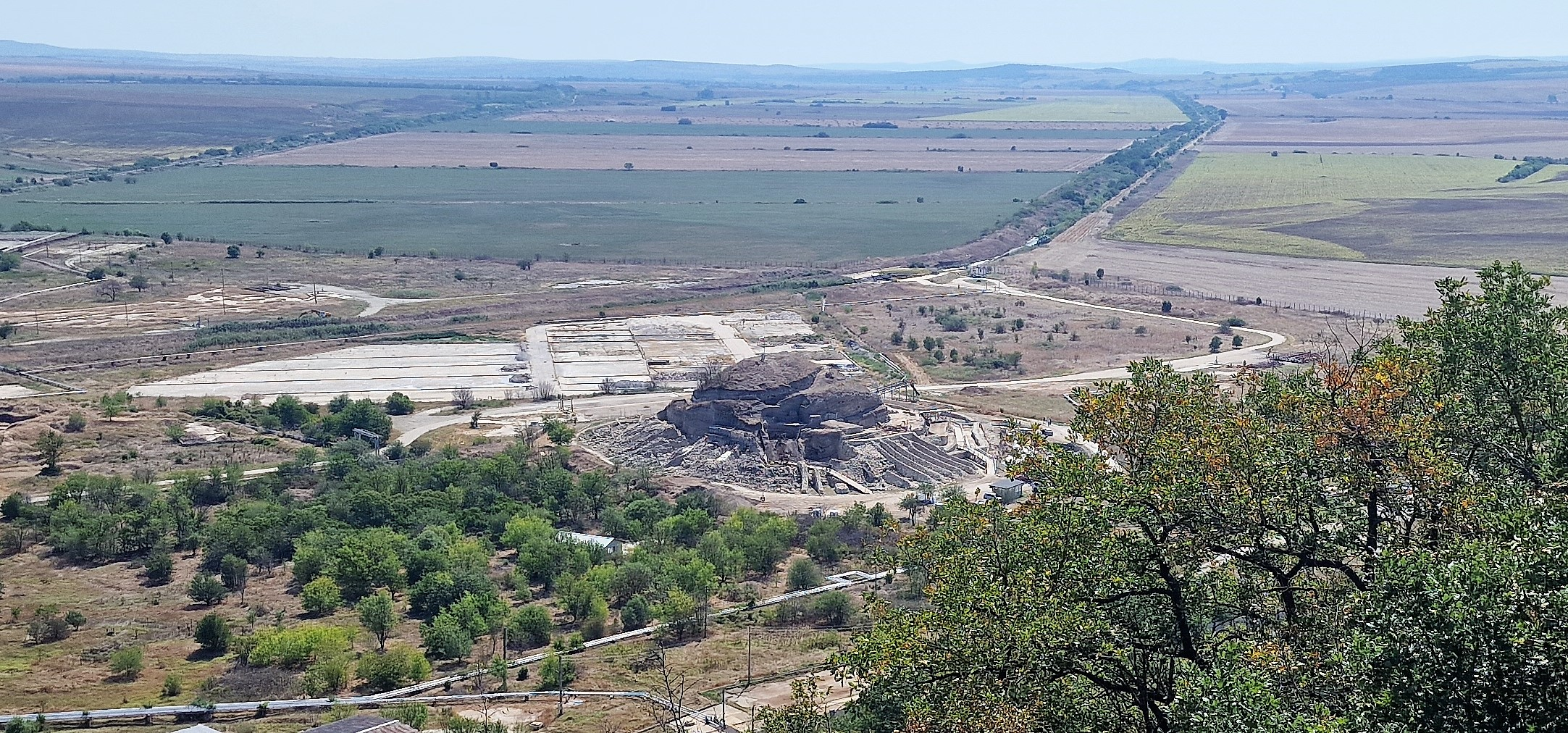
Site of Solnitsata

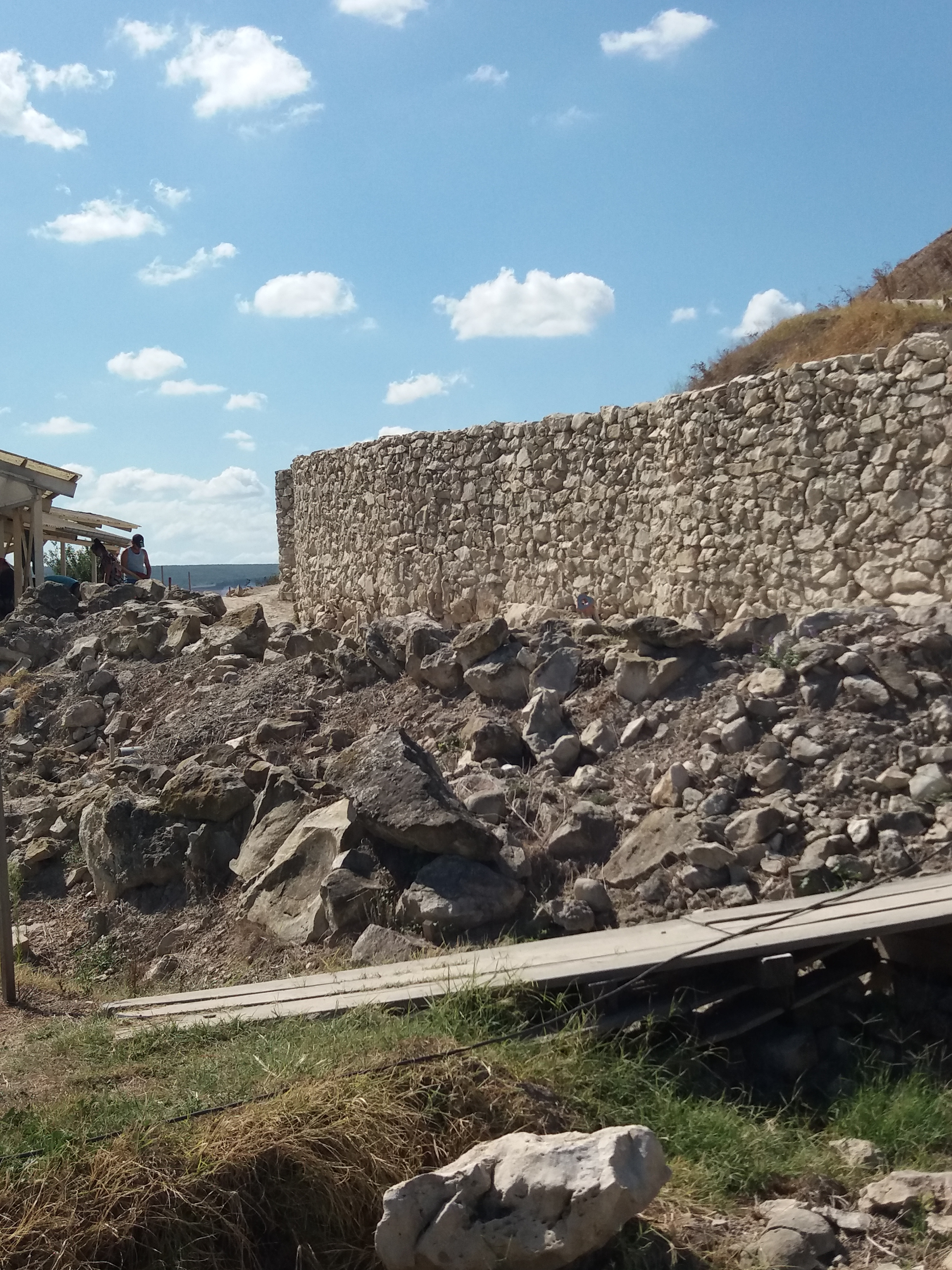
Partly reconstructed wall at the excavation site

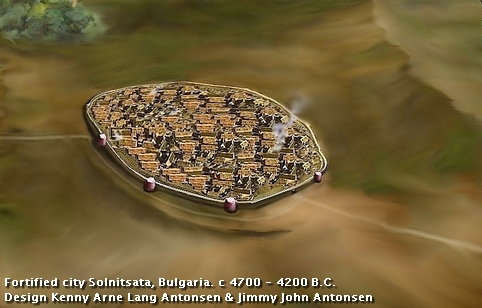
Artist's reconstruction of the settlement

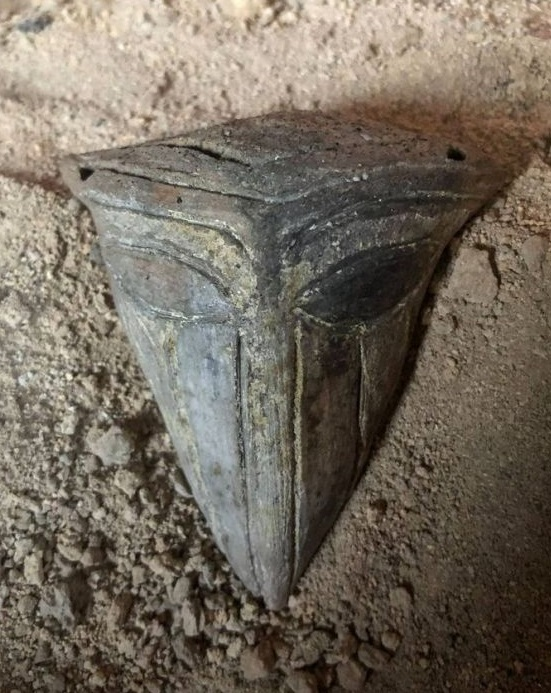
Ceramic mask figurine excavated from the site, dating from c. 4500 BC

== See also ==
- The Mask from Provadia
- Old Europe (archaeology)
- Durankulak (archaeological site)
- Tell Yunatsite
- Karanovo culture
- List of ancient cities in Thrace and Dacia
- Perperikon
- Seuthopolis
