= Domaradzki =

Domaradzki (feminine: Domaradzka; plural: Domaradzcy) is a Polish surname. Notable people with this surname include:

- Jerzy Domaradzki (born 1943), Polish film director
- Mieczysław Domaradzki (1949–1998), Polish archaeologist
- Piotr Domaradzki (1946–2015), Polish-American journalist
