= Tell Yunatsite =

- Селищна могила Юнаците (Bulgarian)
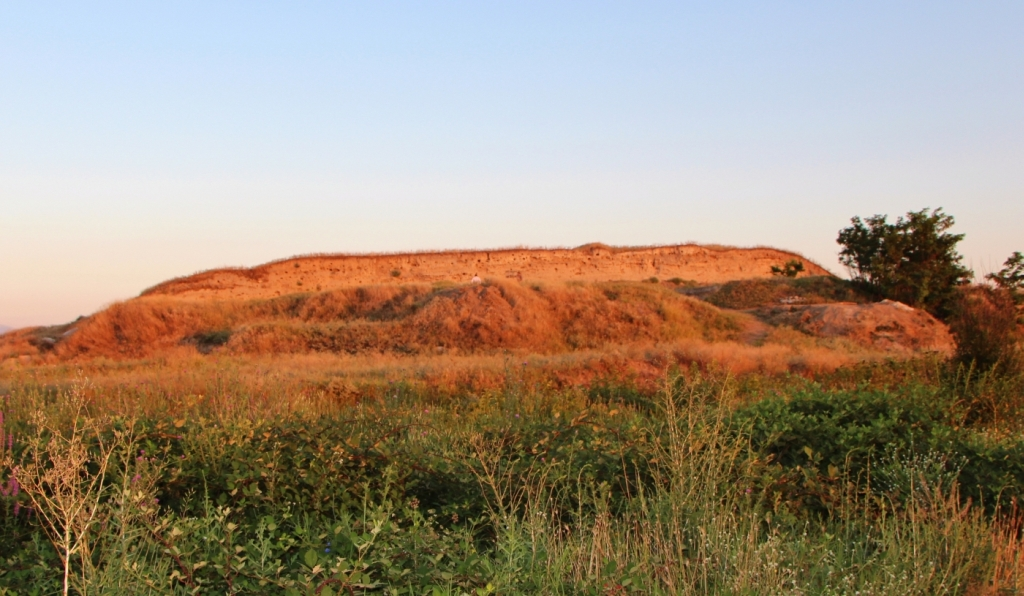
- Tell Yunatsite, 2013

- Location within Bulgaria
- 42°13′56″N 24°15′45″E
- Type: tell
- Location: Pazardzhik, Pazardzhik Province, Bulgaria

Site notes
- Area: 6 ha (15 acres)
- Public access: free

Tell Yunatsite (Bulgarian: Селищна могила Юнаците), also known as Ploskata mogila (Bulgarian: Плоската могила, "The Flat Mound"), is situated in the Pazardzhik Province of southern Bulgaria (Northern Thrace), some 8 kilometres (5 mi) to the west of the district capital Pazardzhik. The tell stands 12 metres (39 ft) above modern ground level and has a diameter of 110 m (360 ft). It is situated on a low terrace at the right bank of the former Topolnitsa riverbed near to its confluence with the Maritsa River (ca. 5 km or 3 mi away from the site). Medieval, Roman, Iron Age, Early Bronze Age, and Copper Age periods have all been attested at the site. The Copper Age tell is associated with the Karanovo culture.

Parallel to the Maritsa River on the Pazardzhik plain lays the so-called Via Diagonalis, one of the most important ancient European roads, which passes through the Balkans and connects West and Central Europe to Anatolia and the Near East. The former road bears witness to the rich history and importance of the region. The plain slants from west to east (300 m to 100 m asl.) and is bordered by the Sredna Gora Mountains to the north and northwest, the Rhodope Mountains to the south, and Rila Mountains to the southwest. The surrounding alpine terrain is significant because it affects the microclimate of the region making it slightly colder during the winters in comparison with the other regions of Northern Thrace.

== History of Research ==
In 1939, Bulgarian archaeologist Vasil Mikov excavated a large trench passing through the central east section of the tell, collecting the first data about its stratigraphy, chronology, and sequence of archaeological cultures. Subsequently, large-scale archaeological excavations began in 1976 under the direction of Rumen Katincharov (Institute of Archaeology with Museum, Sofia, Bulgaria) and Velichka Matsanova (Regional Museum of History, Pazardzhik). Between 1982 and 2000, a Soviet (later Russian) team led by Prof. Nikolay Merpert also took part in the excavations of the site. During the last quarter of the 20th century, the Bulgarian–Soviet–Russian team excavated the eastern third of the tell, expanding on the Mikov trench. They uncovered a medieval cemetery, a Roman fortification, two building levels from the Early Iron Age, a thick layer from the Early Bronze Age (EBA) with 17 building levels, and the underlying Late Chalcolithic layer.

In 2001, the excavations continued under the direction of Dr. Yavor Boyadzhiev (National Institute of Archaeology with Museum, Sofia). The following year, the Bulgarian team was joined by a Greek team led by Dr. Ioannis Aslanis (National Hellenic Research Foundation). The joint project lasted a decade – from 2002 to 2011. It revealed new patterns of prehistoric settlement organization around the tell. Test pits and trenches were excavated in 2006 in the area surrounding the tell and were aimed at locating the prehistoric cemetery, but instead the excavation uncovered Chalcolithic settlement deposits in a radius of 200–250 m (660–820 ft) around the tell in almost every direction. The only exception was to the East where the ancient Topolnitsa River would have been located.

Since 2013, Tell Yunatsite has been the host of an archaeology field school within Balkan Heritage Field School – a program directed by the Balkan Heritage Foundation (BHF) – and, since 2015, also with the Institute for Field Research (IFR). As such, the excavations at Tell Yunatsite are open by application to international participants.

== Stratigraphy ==
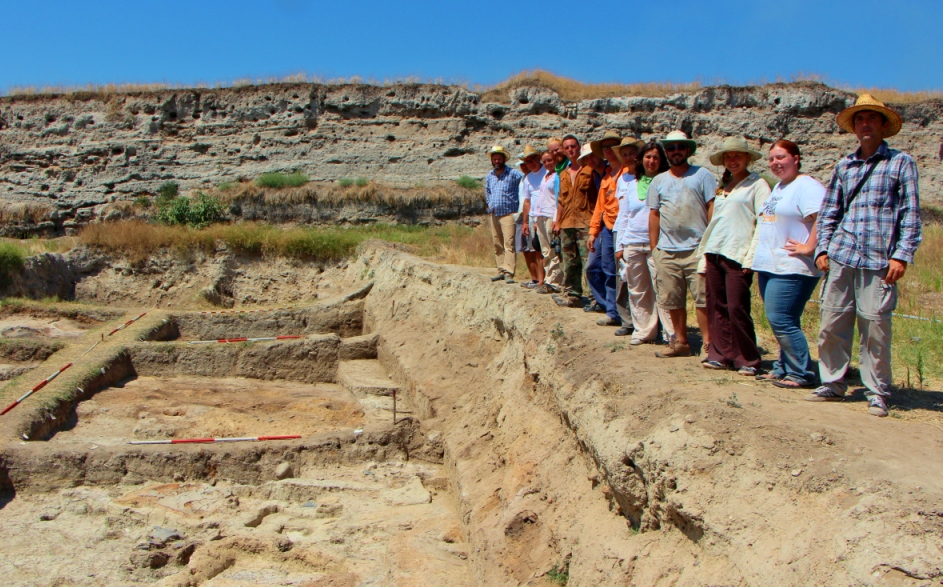
Balkan Heritage Field School students in front of the Tell Yunatsite cross-section profile and beside the Mikov's Trench.

The tell contains the remains of at least 30 settlements (so-called building levels) placed one over the other. Various peoples had settled at the tell altogether for more than 6,000 years, at least from the Early Chalcolithic (5000 BCE) onwards. On top of the tell, a medieval cemetery with Christian burials was excavated. For the most part, the burials were without grave-goods. A small Roman period (2nd to 6th century AD) fortress also existed on the top of the tell. The fortification was further enforced by a ditch surrounding the tell. Both the fortress and the medieval cemetery, to a large extent, disturbed the building layers from the Early and Late Iron Age. However, two building levels from the Early Iron Age (10th to 6th century BCE) and one from the Late Iron Age (5th and 4th century BCE) have been attested.

== Early Bronze Age ==
Tell Yunatsite is one of the most important sites for revealing the cultural development of the Early Bronze Age (3rd millennium BCE) in Thrace. The Early Bronze Age deposits were excavated over an area of 1,100–1,225 m^{2} (11,840–13,190 sq ft). 17 building levels were documented with a total thickness varying from 4.30 to 6.50 m (14.1 to 21.3 ft). Building levels XVII/XVI-XV date to EBA I, building levels XIV-IX date to EBA II, and building levels VIII-I date to EBA III. Each building level is represented by a different number of excavated buildings. As soon as they settled, the EBA people made a palisade, a ditch and "an earthen rampart bearing traces of a palisade", enclosing the northern part of the mound. It is believed that the separated space was a residence area or a sacred space. It was separated until the time of building level XIII. A trench situated in the western part of the mound revealed remains of a fortification established during the time of building levels XII-X. At 100 m (330 ft) to the west of the mound, there was also a multi-layer open-air settlement; the thickness of its cultural layer reaches 2.5 m (8 ft 2 in). In the central part of the tell, the houses related to the earlier EBA building levels rest immediately on top of the remains of the last Chalcolithic level, and sometimes were even slightly dug into them. However, further south, where the Chalcolithic layers slant downwards, a layer of accumulated fine soil is clearly detectable. Its thickness gradually increases to the south, reaching more than 40 cm (16 in). This layer marks a long break in the occupation of the site between the end of the Chalcolithic and the beginning of the EBA.

== Chalcolithic (Copper Age) ==
The results of the excavations so far have demonstrated that the earliest settlement dates to the beginning of the Early Chalcolithic. It probably covered an area of about 100,000–120,000 m^{2} (25–30 acres). In the second half of the Early Chalcolithic (around 4750–4650 BCE) a fortification wall was erected in the eastern part of the settlement, on a small natural plateau 2–3 m higher than the surrounding surface. The preserved remains of the massive earthen fortification wall on the southern slope of the tell are 25 m long, up to 2.50-2.80 m high and 4 m wide. It was made of alternating layers of trampled clay and gravel. The Chalcolithic fortification system was reinforced by a ditch surrounding the wall from the outside. However, only part of the ditch is preserved, as it is largely destroyed by another ditch dating to the Roman Period. The wall protected the tell on its southern and probably western sides. The Topolnitsa river provided natural protection from the north and east. In the course of time the tell was gradually formed inside the limits of this protected area. Very interesting and important in terms of settlement organization is the fact that the wall and the ditch did not protect the entire settlement, but rather only one part of it - a Prehistoric “citadel” raised inside and above the larger settlement. The “citadel” was in use for more than 500 years, until the entire settlement was destroyed by enemies at the end of the 5th millennium BCE. The settlement structure shows some basic characteristics of towns, which emerged in the Near East about 2 000 years later.

The excavations of the Chalcolithic settlements at the tell revealed the rich material and spiritual culture of its inhabitants. The buildings were solid with interiors sometimes decorated in white and red paint. Pits for meat conservation and preservation (the earliest known so far) were investigated. The Chalcolithic pottery is of excellent quality and its varied and rich decoration shows the high aesthetic vision of the craftsmen. The typical household inventory includes tools and weapons made of stone, copper, bone and antler. The varied anthropomorphic, zoomorphic and ornithomorphic figurines as well as the syncretic combinations between the three reveal some aspects of the religious beliefs of the people. Additionally, at Tell Yunatsite was attested one of the earliest “surgical operations” discovered in Europe – the wrist amputation of a woman who continued to use her arm for years afterwards.

The last Chalcolithic settlement at Tell Yunatsite was destroyed by a brutal attack. The people who were inside (mainly children, elderly men and women) were killed. Skeletons with traces of a violent death were found among the debris of the burnt dwellings.

Since 2012, excavations were renewed within the trench made by V. Mikov in 1939. The aim was to clarify the stratigraphy of the Chalcolithic layer and gradually to reach the lowest (earliest) settlement of the tell. At least 5 Chalcolithic building levels have been attested so far in this part and a control trench in the periphery of the tell suggests the presence of at least 3 more. The pottery assemblage of the lower settlements reached so far in the Mikov's trench is dated to the mid 5th millennium BCE. Some interesting structures have been revealed, including a well preserved non-burnt wooden floor platform (very rare for this early period and geographical area). Among the numerous finds, the rich collection of Spondylus shell bracelets and beads is worth noting as they bear witness to intense trade connections with the Aegean sea coast. Other important finds are five ceramic vessel base fragments and a clay plate with incised signs on them. The systematic occurrence of such signs at other contemporary sites in Bulgaria and the Balkans has provided grounds to assume the development of some early writing system – the earliest in the world.

== See also ==
- Old Europe
- Durankulak (archaeological site)
- List of ancient cities in Thrace and Dacia
- Karanovo culture
- Perperikon
- Seuthopolis
- Solnitsata
- Varna culture
