= Pistiros =

Ancient Greek trade center in Pazardzhik Province, Bulgaria

Coordinates: 42.2808°N 24.0464°E

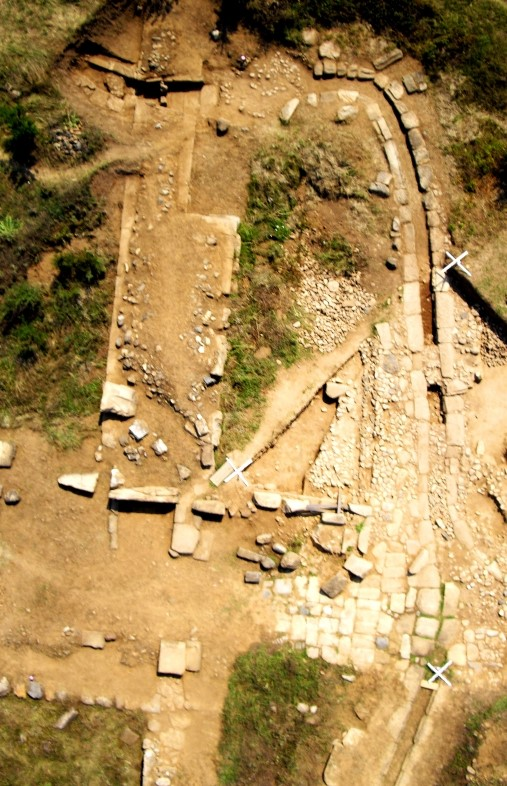
Pistiros. Aerial view of main excavation area (2009)

Pistiros (Bulgarian: Пистирос, Ancient Greek, Πίστιρος) was an inland Ancient Greek emporion, or trade center, in Ancient Thrace. It is located near the modern city of Vetren, in the westernmost part of the Maritsa River valley.

The identification of the site as Emporion Pistiros, a name known from ancient sources, is largely based on an ancient Greek inscription, known as the Vetren inscription, discovered nearby in 1990 (see below). The emporion sustained intensive relations with the main economic centers in Aegean Thrace, including Thasos, Maroneia, and Apollonia, and flourished in the 4th century BC.

== History ==
=== Founding ===
Pistiros was founded in the 3rd quarter of the 5th century BC. This would place its founding during the reign of the first kings of the Odrysian kingdom: Teres I, Sparatocos or Sitalkes. The city was most likely founded by colonists from the coastal city of Pistyros. The location of the emporion offered many strategic advantages. In addition to the site's proximity to lumber sources and copper, iron, and gold mines, it was situated on the Hebros River, which was navigable for small boats, and was at the intersection of several major roads.

=== Chronology ===
Archaeological excavations have uncovered the eastern fortification wall with a gate, towers, and a bastion, built of stone blocks on the model of Thasian fortification systems, as well as stone-paved streets, buildings with stone bases, and a well-constructed sewer system. The excavations suggest the following phases of the site:

- I phase (second half of the 5th century BC – end of the first quarter of the 4th century BC): foundation of the emporion, building of the fortification system, pavement of the first streets, building of the drainage system.
- II phase (second quarter – end of the 4th century BC): reconstruction of the site's plan, connected with the reign of King Cotys I, heyday of Pistiros, regulations concerning the statute of Pistiros and its emporia (Ancient Greek, ἐμπορία) in the Vetren inscription.
- III phase (3rd century BC – beginning of the 2nd century BC): burning down and destruction of Pistiros by the Celts in the late 3rd century BC as well as its transformation into a metal production center.

=== Society and religion ===
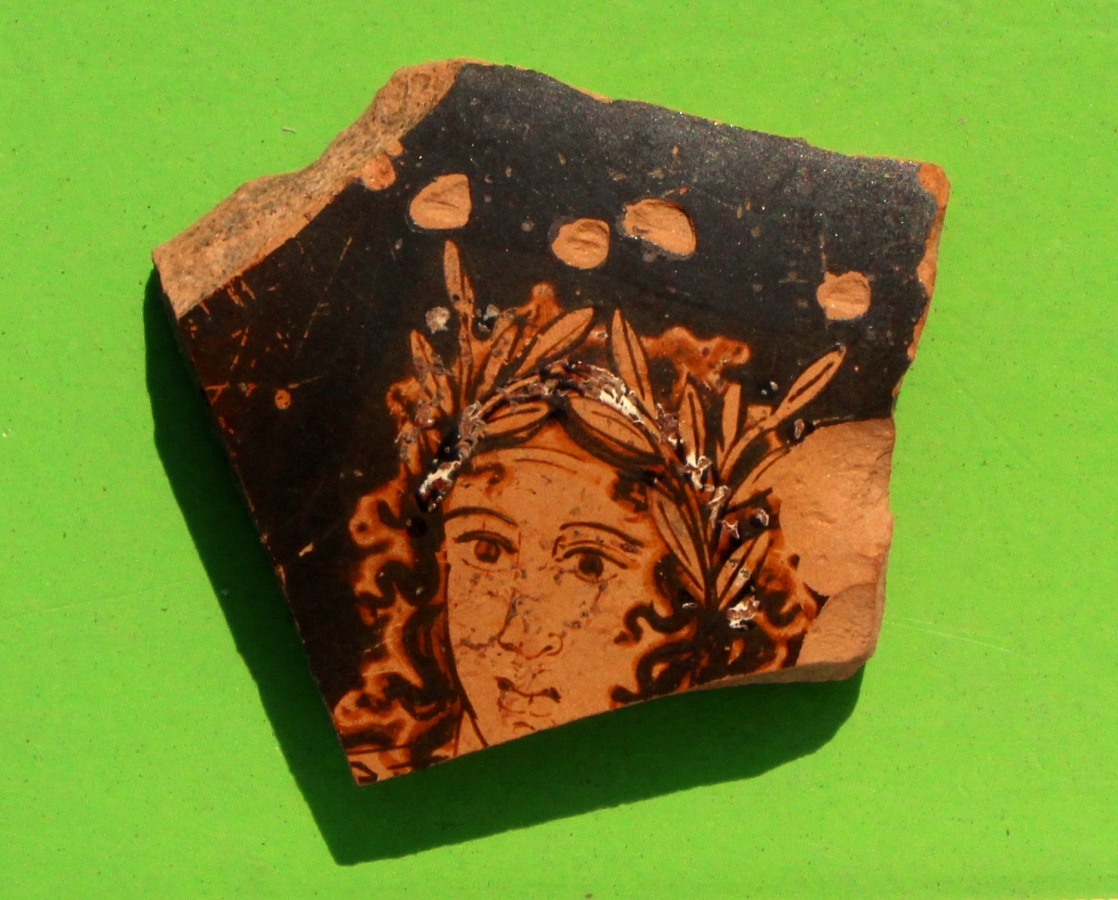
Face of Apollo or Dionysus depicted on a red-figure pottery fragment found in Pistiros (2015).

The co-existence between the Greeks and Thracians rendered them allies to a certain extent. The grave inscriptions of Greeks originating from Apollonia and Maroneia, discovered in Pistiros, and the names incised on pottery (graffiti) both of Thracians and Greeks, prove that the people from Pistiros were not ethnically homogeneous. Adjacent to the territory of emporion Pistiros were the Bessoi, the keepers of the Dionysian sanctuary in the Rhodopes. The oath taken in Dionysos’ name by King Cotys I and his successor, according to the Vetren inscription (see below), represents additional proof for the significance of that cult in the official ideology of the Odrysian state. The excavations have produced a great deal of evidence regarding cult practices in Pistiros. Among the artifacts discovered are preserved or fragmented clay altars with various forms and decorations (several of them preserved in situ), cult zoomorphic figurines made of clay or stone, clay anthropomorphic figurines, and miniature objects and portable hearths (pyraunoi).

=== Economy ===
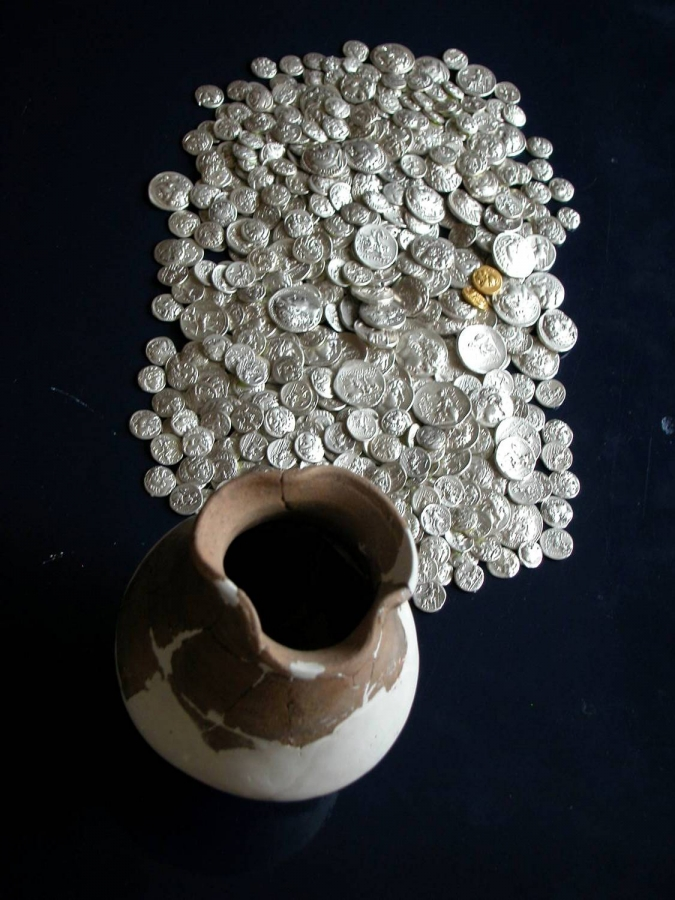
Coin hoard (3rd century BCE) found in Pistiros

Emporion Pistiros maintained wide trade contacts. Under Cotys I (384 BC–359 BC) and his successors, the Thasian, Apollonian, and Maroneian traders of the city obtained guarantees, as described in the Vetren inscription (see below), concerning the integrity of their life, property and activity. This status coincided with the period of greatest economic prosperity for Pistiros.

More than 1000 copper and silver coins discovered during the excavations in Pistiros shed light on its internal and external trade contacts. This is the unique numismatic complex discovered during ordinary excavations where the coinage of several Thracian rulers is represented, including Amadocus I, Bergaios, Cotys I, Amadocus II, Teres II, Cersobleptes, and Seuthes III. The collection also contains coins from several Greek city-states, including Thasos, Maroneia, Parion, Thracian Chersonese, Kypsela, Enos, Apollonia, Messembria, Damastion, Sermyle, and Kardia. Also included in the find is coinage of Ancient Macedonian and Hellenistic rulers (Philip II, Alexander the Great, Cassandros, Demetrios Poliorketes, Lysimachos, Seleucus I, etc.). In 1999 another fundamental discovery was made – a collective find consisting of 552 silver and gold coins issued by Alexander the Great, Demetrios Poliorketes, Lysimachos and Seleucus I.

The inhabitants of this antique center imported luxury pottery from Attic workshops for their domestic usage. Among the painted pottery discovered in Pistiros, vessels of krater and scyphos types predominate, while those of the kylix and pelike types are more uncommon. Scenes of everyday life, mythology, leisure, and games of the ancient Greeks are depicted on the vessels. Represented in more variety are black glazed pottery wares, including scyphoi, kanthaoroi, bowls and one-handled cups, kylices and various shapes of latter type, lekythoi, and fish plates. The import of luxurious Attic pottery in Pistiros was interrupted around the mid 3rd century BC. This trend is typical for the entire Thracian plain.

Among the significant number of amphora fragments, the greatest number are of those manufactured in Thasian workshops or in those belonging to the Thasian peraea. Various patterns of autochthonous pottery (both wheel- and hand-made) prevail compared to the imported pottery. In some cases, the vessels have been entirely preserved, as in the case of several sealed oenochoai representing various scenes of the Dionysian cult (Silenus abducting a maenad, a Satyr's masque).

Thrace with its rich ledges succeeds in attracting the interest of the population from Aegean region. Emporion Pistiros, which was created under the tutelage of the Thracian kings, became a key center in the export of metals from Thrace to Greece. In addition to exporting metal, Thracians also produced jewellery, and a variety of archaeological finds in Pistiros, including crucibles, blowers, cuts, matrixes, and molds, are evidence for the presence of jewellery workshops within the emporion. After the Celts burned down the emporion in the early 3rd century BC, a village was built on its remains, in which fibulae and other ornaments made of iron, bronze, silver and gold were manufactured.

== The Vetren inscription ==
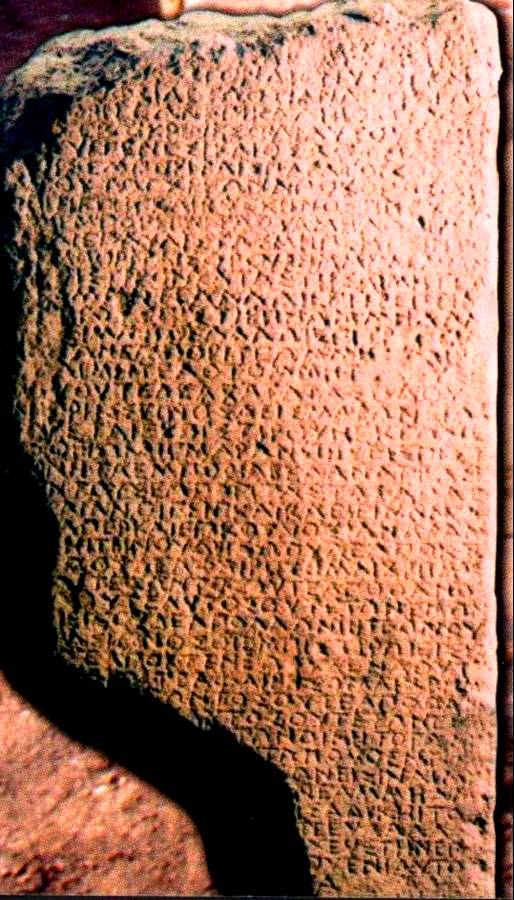
Vetren inscription found near Pistiros (4th century BCE)

The discovery in 1990 of the Vetren inscription led to the identification of the excavation site as Emporion Pistiros, a site attested in the ancient literary tradition. The inscription was discovered at the nearby site of Bona Mansio, approximately 3 km away. Survey evidence from Bona Mansio reveals that a large number of stones used in the construction of the mansio were taken from the city walls of Emporion Pistiros. Given the proximity of Bona Mansio to the modern excavation site, this discovery presents strong evidence that the site is in fact Emporion Pistiros.

The inscription in Ancient Greek states:

"If a merchant brings suit against another merchant (in Pistiros) they shall be judged among their kinsmen and with regard to whatever is owed to the merchants by Thracians, there shall be no cancellation of these debts. All land and pasture owned by the merchants shall not be taken away from them. He shall not send holders of estates(?) to the merchants. He shall not install a garrison at Pistiros nor will he transfer Pistiros to another. He shall not exchange the land lots of the Pistirians nor transfer them to another. Neither he nor members of his family shall seize the property of the merchants. He shall not levy road taxes on any goods exported by the merchants from Pistiros to Maronea or from Maronea to Pistiros or to the market place Belana of the Praseoi. The merchants shall open and close their wagons. Just as also in the time of Cotys [I swear this oath]; neither I nor anyone of my family will blind or kill a citizen of Maronea; nor shall I or any member of my family seize the property of a citizen of Maronea, whether he be alive or dead; nor shall I nor anyone of my family will blind or kill a citizen of Apollonia or Thasos who is living in Pistiros whether he is alive or dead".

Editors of the text have said that it is an official document from the Thracian royal court and presents evidence for the authoritative power of the Thracian king in the political and economic life of Emporion Pistiros. The emporion maintained its political autonomy.

== Archaeological excavations ==
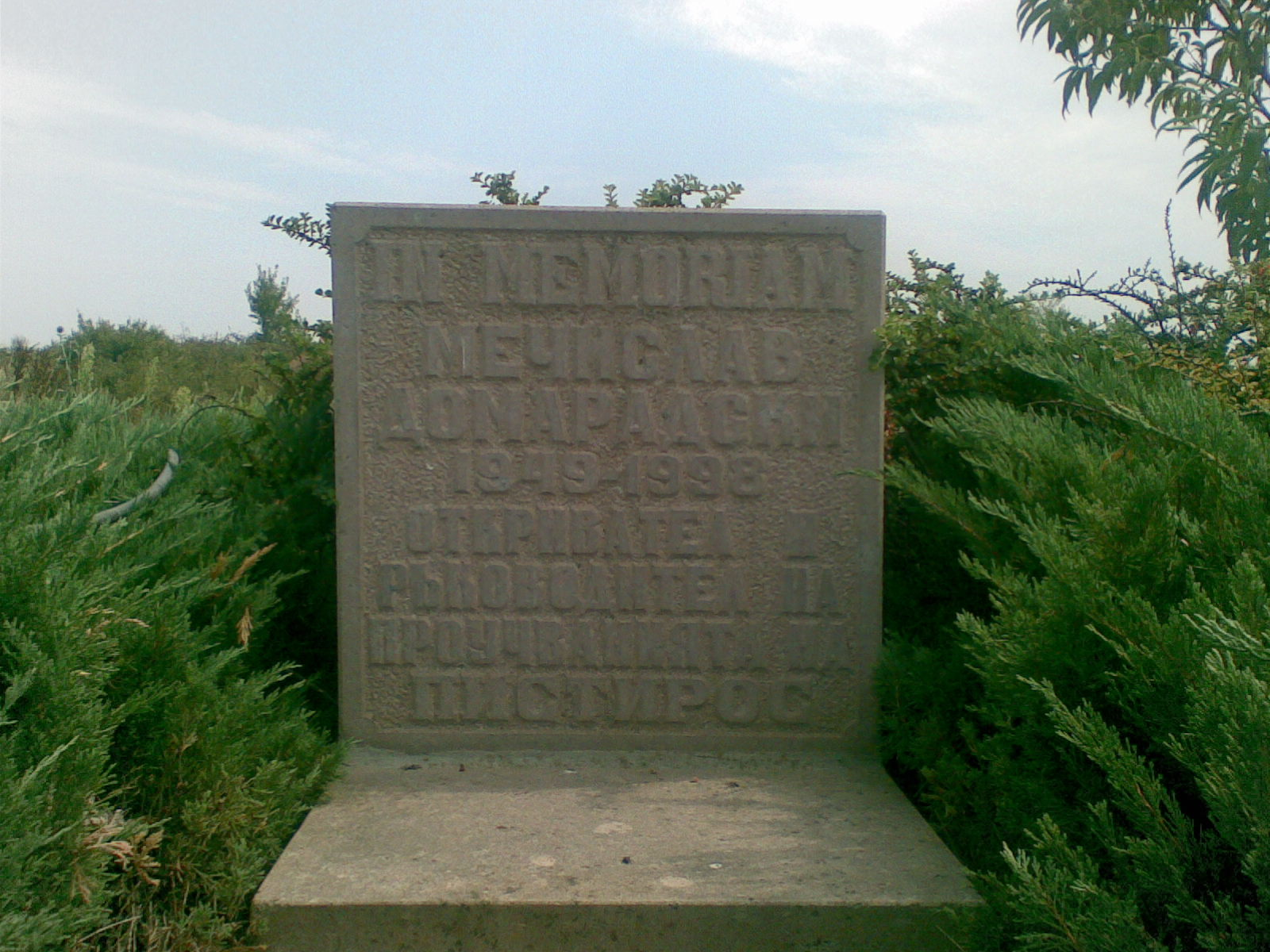
The memorial plaque in Pistiros of the discoverer of the ancient settlement, Mieczyslaw Domaradzki.

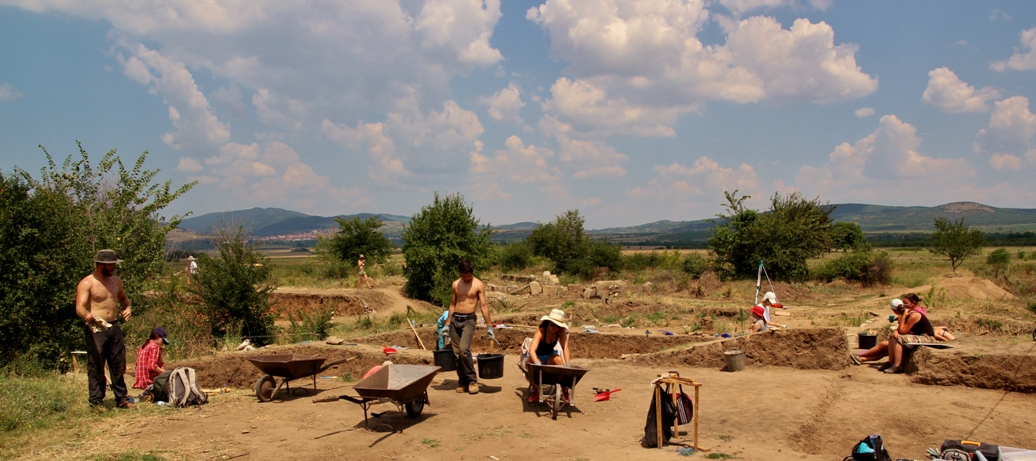
The archaeological field school at Pistiros (Balkan Heritage Field School)

The excavation of the archaeological site on the left bank of Maritsa began in 1988, at which time excavators discovered a large trade center – Emporion Pistiros – that played a major role in the economical and cultural life of Ancient Thrace.

The excavations of Emporion Pistiros are conducted by a team of Bulgarian, British (Liverpool University), Polish, Czech (Prague University), and French (French School in Athens) archaeologists. The research work is carried out under the scientific guidance of the National Archaeological Institute with Museum – Bulgarian Academy of Sciences in co-operation with the Archaeological Museum “Prof. Mieczysław Domaradzki” in the town of Septemvri.

Archaeologists are working to understand how it was possible to found a strongly fortified Greek city so far inland, even if the settlement was apparently accessible for small boats on the Hebrus River. An early theory offered by Professor Mieczyslaw Domaradzki was that the city was also a royal residence of the sub-king of the Upper Thrace. No palace, or any other archaeological evidence for significant social hierarchy, has been uncovered at Pistiros, in contrast to other Thracian sites such as Seuthopolis, and M. Domardzki changed his mind soon after the inscription was found. Only a few scholars, among them G. Tsetskhladze, still expressed such opinion by the late nineties. The identification of the site as Emporion Pistiros continues to present some controversy.

Since 2013, an annual archaeological field school has operated in Pistiros as part of the Balkan Heritage Field School program. The program is run by the Balkan Heritage Foundation with the cooperation of the Septemvri Archaeological Museum "Prof. Mieczyslaw Domaradzki," and the New Bulgarian University.

The rich archaeological material found in Pistiros is preserved in the Archaeological Museum “Prof. Mieczysław Domaradzki,” in the town of Septemvri. The archaeological excavations in Pistiros have been discussed in many scientific conferences, publications, and exhibitions.

== Namesake lake ==
Pistiros Lake in Antarctica is named after it.

== See also ==
- List of ancient cities in Thrace and Dacia
- Maroneia
- Apollonia
- Thasos

== Publications ==
- Домарадски, М., 1991, "Том I. Емпорион Пистирос: Трако-гръцки търговски отношения" ИК "Беллопринт" - Пазарджик, 1991 г.
- Домарадски, М., 1994 г., "Изложба цар Котис I. Тракийската държава. Емпорион Пистирос", каталог, гр. Септември, 1994 г.
- Домарадски, М., Танева, В., 1998 г., "Том II. Емпорион Пистирос: Тракийската култура в прехода към елинистичната епоха", гр. Септември, 1998.
- Bouzek, J., Domaradzki, M., Archibald, Z., eds. 1997: Pistiros I, Excavations and Studies, Prague.
- Bouzek, J., Domaradzka, L., Archibald, Z., eds. 2002: Pistiros II, Excavations and Studies, Prague.
- Bouzek, J., Domaradzka, L., Archibald, Z., eds. 2007: Pistiros III, Excavations and Studies, Prague.
- Bouzek, J., Domaradzka, L., eds. 2005: The Culture of Thracians and their Neighbours: Proceedings of the International Symposium in Memory of Prof. Mieczyslaw Domaradzki, with a Round Table "Archaeological Map of Bulgaria", BAR International Series 1350.
- Domaradzki, M., Domaradzka, L., Bouzek, J., Rostropowicz, J., eds. 2000: Pistiros et Thasos: Structures economiques dans la peninsule balkanique aux VII e — II e siecles av. J.-C., Opole.
- Lazova, Tsvete (2022). "The Archaeological Site of Pistiros: Venturing to Change the Traditional Paradigm in Bulgarian Archaeology". Ancient West & East. 21: 89–107. doi:10.2143/AWE.21.0.3291139.
