= Mask from Provadia =

Ancient artifact

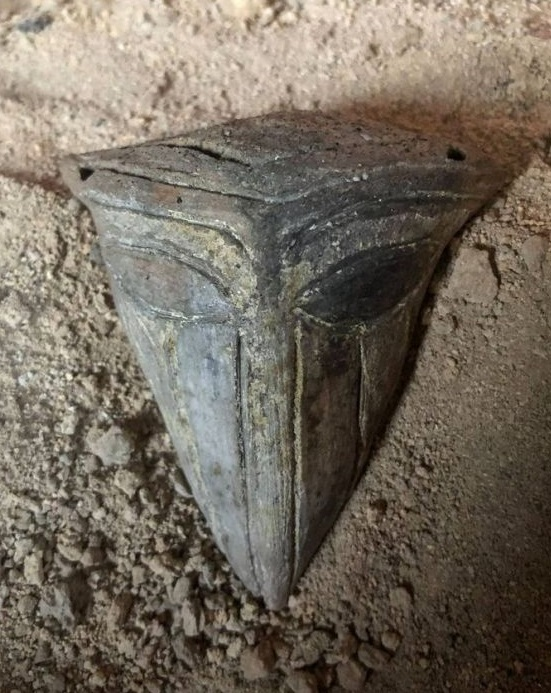
- Material: Clay
- Length: c. 5 cm
- Created: c. 4500 BC
- Discovered: Varna, Bulgaria

The Mask from Provadia is a Chalcolithic artifact that was found at the Solnitsata archeological site.

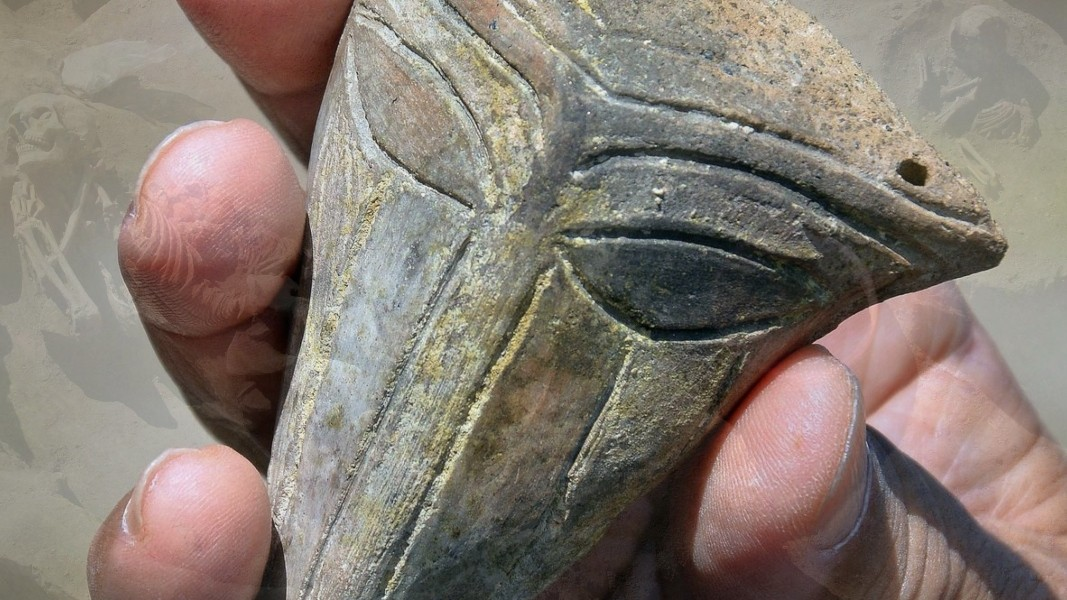

The mask has no mouth and features a stylized nose and elliptical eyes. There are small holes on the artifact that are believed to have been used to hang up or wear the artifact.

The artifact is one of many others found at the site. The area also includes a mass grave and salt extraction facilities.
