= Balkan Heritage Foundation =

The Balkan Heritage Foundation (BHF) is a Bulgarian public, non-profit, non-governmental organization. It was established in 2008 by a team of a cross-institutional program implementing archaeological field schools since 2003. Its head office is located in Stara Zagora, Bulgaria. The BHF has a representative office located in Sofia and four branches located in Varna, Mezek, Dragoman and Emona, Bulgaria.

The Balkan Heritage Foundation's mission is to support the protection, conservation, management and promotion of cultural and historical (both tangible and intangible) heritage of South-eastern Europe as necessary preconditions for sustainable development of the region.

The foundation collaborates on both the local and global level with universities, museums, research institutes, media, business companies, governmental and non-governmental organizations. It raises funds and consequently funds projects implemented by research institutes and scientific teams, museums, municipalities and local communities. Since it was established, the foundation has been implementing and financially supporting the following programs, projects and activities:

== Balkan Heritage Field School ==
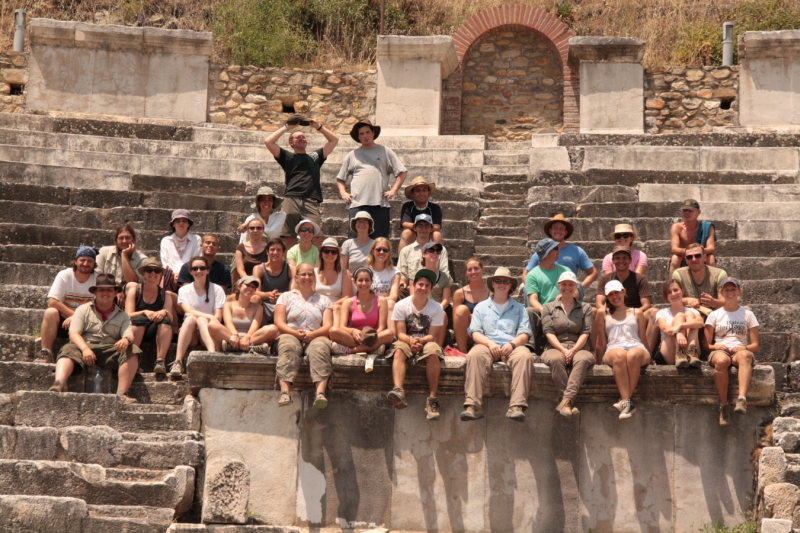
Balkan Heritage Field School at Heraclea Lyncestis, North Macedonia.

The Balkan Heritage Field School (BHFS) is an archaeological field school annually providing a number of courses (projects) in archeology, anthropology and history of South-Eastern Europe, documentation, conservation and restoration of historic artifacts and monuments, taught in English and located within Bulgaria and North Macedonia. The school admits both academic students and non-academic students. The BHFS, operating since 2003, was fully incorporated by the Balkan Heritage Foundation in 2008.

=== Activities ===
The BHFS courses are affiliated with ongoing excavation (Neolithic settlement in Ilindentsi, Tell Yunatsite, Bresto, emporion Pistiros, Stobi, Bona Mansio and Apollonia Pontica conservation and documentation projects contributing to the study and preservation of the Balkan cultural heritage and are usually supplemented by trips to attractive historical sites and cities in Bulgaria, North Macedonia, Greece, Serbia and Montenegro. The school concept envisions that every course combines three basic educational modules: theoretical (lectures, presentations and field trainings), practical (either excavation field work and lab work or conservation of historic artifacts and monuments) and excursions plus behind-the-scene visits. The BHFS courses are listed among the academic courses of New Bulgarian University, Queen's University, Kingston, Canada; and UCLA Extension, enabling their participants to obtain credit hours upon request.

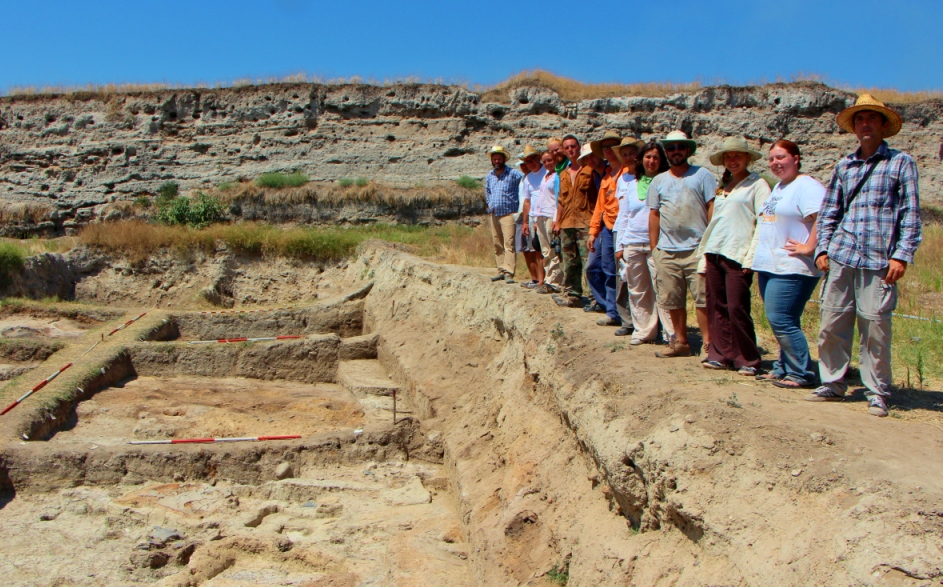
Balkan Heritage Field School students at Tell Yunatsite, Bulgaria.

The BHFS functions as a legal part of the Balkan Heritage Foundation, a Bulgarian public, non-profit, non-governmental organization. Since 2003 the BHFS has organized 85 courses in the field of archaeology, documentation of medieval frescoes and conservation of Ancient Greek and Roman pottery, mural paintings and mosaics. These courses have been attended by more than 1500 students from 55 countries.

The Program's head office is located in Sofia, Bulgaria. Costs of courses and study materials can be found by viewing the website. The BHFS admission fees support the Balkan Heritage Protection Fund.

== Excavation projects funded ==
1. Excavation of Tell Yunatsite, Bulgaria (since 2013).
2. Excavation of the Ancient Greek Emporion Pistiros, Bulgaria (since 2013).
3. Apollonia Pontica Excavation Project, Bulgaria (since 2011) - еxcavation of the multi-period (Archaic and Classical, Hellenistic and Late Antique) site on the island of St. Kirik, Sozopol.
4. Excavation of the Neolithic settlement Ilindentsi, Bulgaria (since 2011).
5. Stobi Excavation Project, North Macedonia (since 2010).
6. Heraclea Lyncestis Excavation Project, North Macedonia (2008 - 2012)
7. Djanavara Excavation Project, Bulgaria (2009 - 2011) - excavation of the monumental Early Byzantine church and monastery on Djanavara hill in Varna.
8. Augusta Traiana – Beroia – Borui Rescue Excavation Project in Stara Zagora, Bulgaria (2008-2009).

== Documentation, conservation and restoration projects funded ==
1. Photo Research Expedition to Medieval Balkan Churches, Bulgaria (since 2008).
2. Workshop for Documentation, Conservation and Restoration of Ancient Greek and Hellenistic Pottery in Emona, Bulgaria (since 2009).
3. Workshop for Documentation, Conservation and Restoration of Roman and Late Roman Pottery, Glassware, Mural Paintings and Mosaics at Stobi, North Macedonia (since 2010).

== Volunteer and advocacy actions ==
In 2008-2009 four volunteer work camps supporting preservation of cultural heritage took place in Bitola (North Macedonia), Stara Zagora, Dragoman and Mezek (Bulgaria) in cooperation with Stara Zagora Regional Museum of History, municipalities of Dragoman and Svilengrad (Bulgaria) and Youth Cultural Center Bitola (North Macedonia).
