= Mieczysław Domaradzki =

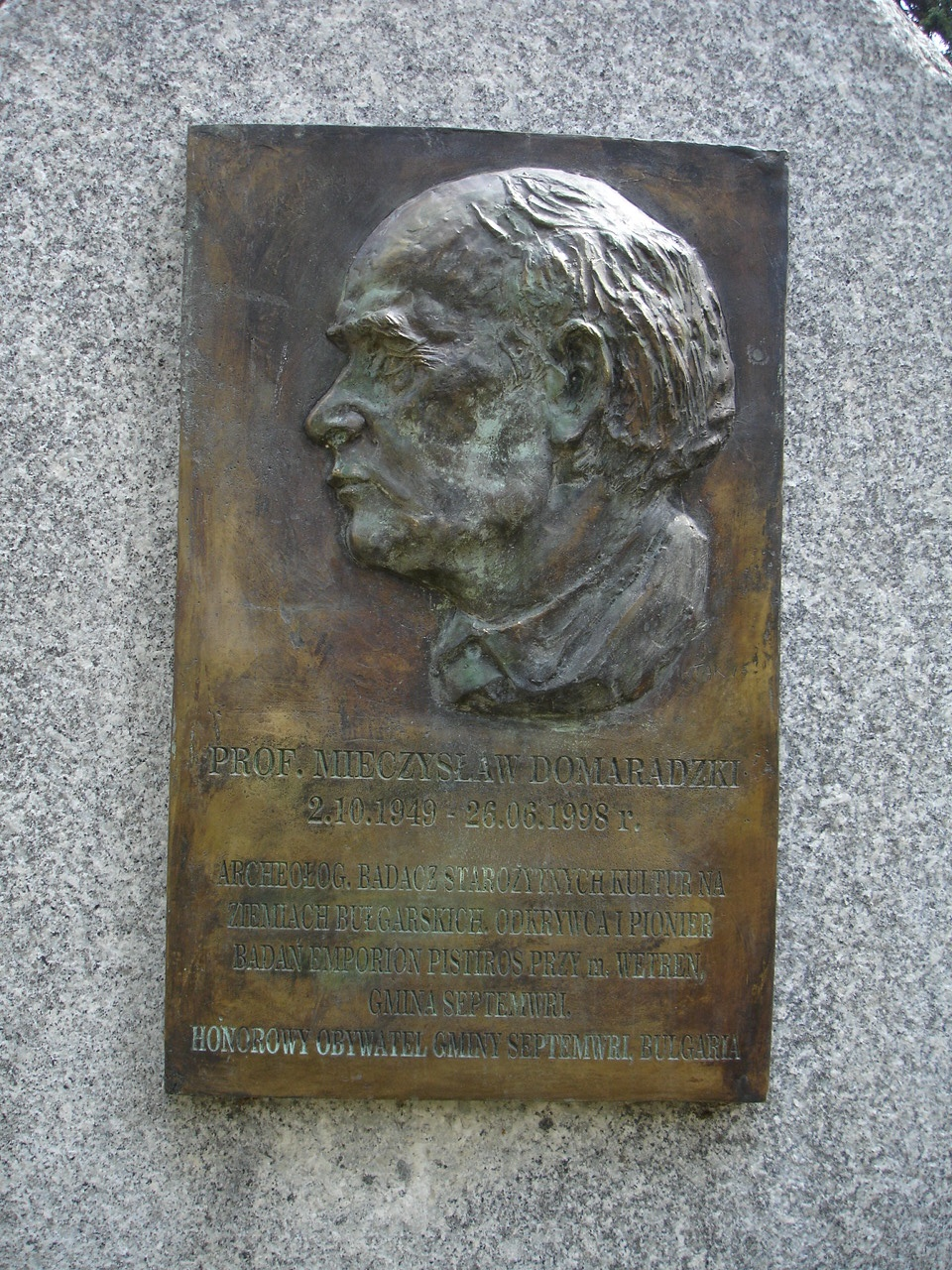
The memorial plate in Lewin Brzeski of Mieczysław Domaradzki.

Mieczysław Marian Domaradzki (Bulgarian: Мечислав Домарадски, Mechislav Domaradski; October 2, 1949, in Brzeg, Poland – June 26, 1998, in Septemvri, Bulgaria) was a Polish archaeologist and Bulgarian thracologist. Professor Mieczyslaw Domaradzki has devoted his career to Thracian archaeology in Bulgaria. He was the founder of the project "An archaeological map of Bulgaria" and also the discoverer of the emporium Pistiros, an important site founded in the fifth century B.C. in the upper Maritsa (ancient Hebrus) valley, remarkable for its inland location. The archaeological material found in Pistiros is preserved in the Archaeological Museum “Prof. Mieczysław Domaradzki” – in the town of Septemvri.

Domaradzki graduated in archaeology from the Jagiellonian University in Kraków. He defended a master's degree thesis on the Celtic shield in Europe under Kazimierz Godłowski in 1972. In 1973, Domaradzki was awarded a doctorate grant by the Bulgarian Academy of Sciences and arrived in Bulgaria to study ancient Thrace of the 1st millennium BC. He spent the 22 years from 1976, when he took his doctor's degree (his dissertation was about the Celtic invasions in Thrace) under professor Ivan Venedikov, to his death in 1998, based in that country. Domaradzki was a regular reader at Veliko Tarnovo University and held a master's course on Celtic art at New Bulgarian University, besides giving lectures at various Central European universities, most notably the Jagiellonian University, the University of Warsaw and the Charles University in Prague. In late 1997, he was appointed head of the Department of Archaeology at the University of Opole.

== Publications ==
- Домарадски, М., 1991, "Том I. Емпорион Пистирос: Трако-гръцки търговски отношения" ИК "Беллопринт" - Пазарджик, 1991 г.;
- Домарадски, М., 1994 г., "Изложба цар Котис I. Тракийската държава. Емпорион Пистирос", каталог, гр. Септември, 1994 г.;
- Домарадски, М., Танева, В., 1998 г., "Том II. Емпорион Пистирос: Тракийската култура в прехода към елинистичната епоха", гр. Септември, 1998.;
- Bouzek, J., Domaradzki, M., Archibald, Z., eds. 1997: Pistiros I, Excavations and Studies, Prague;
- Bouzek, J., Domaradzka, L., Archibald, Z., eds. 2002: Pistiros II, Excavations and Studies, Prague;
- Bouzek, J., Domaradzka, L., eds. 2005: The Culture of Thracians and their Neighbours: Proceedings of the International Symposium in Memory of Prof. Mieczyslaw Domaradzki, with a Round Table "Archaeological Map of Bulgaria", BAR International Series 1350;
- Domaradzki, M., Domaradzka, L., Bouzek, J., Rostropowicz, J., eds. 2000: Pistiros et Thasos: Structures economiques dans la peninsule balkanique aux VII e — II e siecles av. J.-C., Opole;
- Bouzek, J., Domaradzka, L., Archibald, Z., eds. 2007: Pistiros III, Excavations and Studies, Prague.
