= Karanovo culture =

Neolithic to Chalcolithic culture in Bulgaria

- Horizon: Old Europe, First Temperate Neolithic
- Period: Neolithic, Chalcolithic
- Dates: circa 7th millennium BC — 4,000 BC
- Type site: Karanovo
- Preceded by: Mesolithic Europe
- Followed by: Hamangia culture, Varna culture, Gumelnița culture, Cernavodă culture

The Karanovo culture (Bulgarian: Карановска култура, romanized: Karanovska kultura) is a Neolithic culture (Karanovo I-III ca. 62nd to 55th centuries BC) named after the Bulgarian village of Karanovo (Караново, Sliven Province 42°30′41″N 25°54′54″E). The culture, which is part of the Danube civilization, is considered the largest and most important of the Azmak River Valley agrarian settlements.

== Discovery ==
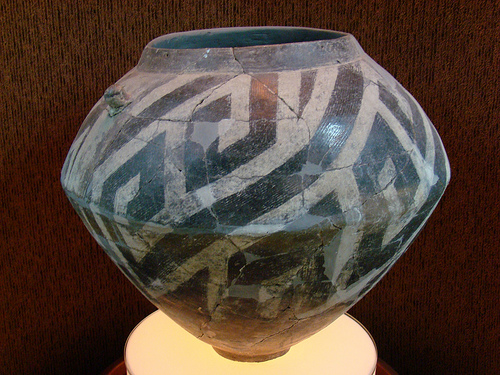
Karanovo culture ceramic vessel, 6th millennium BC (Karanovo I), Stara Zagora Neolithic Dwellings Museum

Archaeologists discovered the Karanovo settlement in the 1930s when a tell - a settlement mound - was excavated at Karanovo. The hilltop settlement is constituted of 18 buildings, which housed some 100 inhabitants. The site was inhabited more or less continuously from the early 7th to the early 2nd millennia BC.

The Karanovo culture served as the foundation of the East Balkan cultural sequence. The layers at Karanovo are employed as a chronological system for Balkans prehistory. This culture had seven major phases: Karanovo I and II, which existed parallel to Starčevo; Karanovo III (Veselinovo); Karanovo IV; Karanovo V (Marica); Karanovo VI (Gumelniţa); and, Karanovo VII, which emerged during the Early Bronze Age. The Karanovo I is considered a continuation of Near Eastern settlement type. Karanovo VI appeared to have collapsed around 4000 BC without any signs of conquest or resettlement.

== Characteristics ==
Some of the main characteristics of the Karanovo culture are the white-painted pottery and dark-painted vessels obtained from the tell. These artifacts were particularly associated with the first and second phases. There is also the case of The Gumelnita Lovers, a terracotta statuette crafted from 5000-4750 BCE. This artifact, which was excavated at the Gumelnita Tell in southern Romania, is associated with the culture's notion of fertility. There is also the Karanovo macroblade technology, which featured semi-steep and steep retouching as well as the use of yellow flint with white spots. This particular technology, which is also known as "Karanovo blade", emerged during the culture's early Neolithic phase. Scholars note its interesting length and width: 100 mm long and between 15 mm and 23 mm wide.

Karanovo II is distinguished from its predecessor due to its influence on the Thracian culture, or the assimilation of its elements into those inherited from Karanovo I. The basic characteristics of this phase continued until Karanovo III and were particularly pronounced in its coarsely made ware, such as pitchers, shallow dishes, and cylindrical vases (e.g. Kügel).

The burial practices of Karanovo I and II were similar to the practices of other eastern Balkan cultures, such as the Kremikovci, Dudesti, and Ovcarovo cultures.

== Gallery ==
=== Artefacts ===
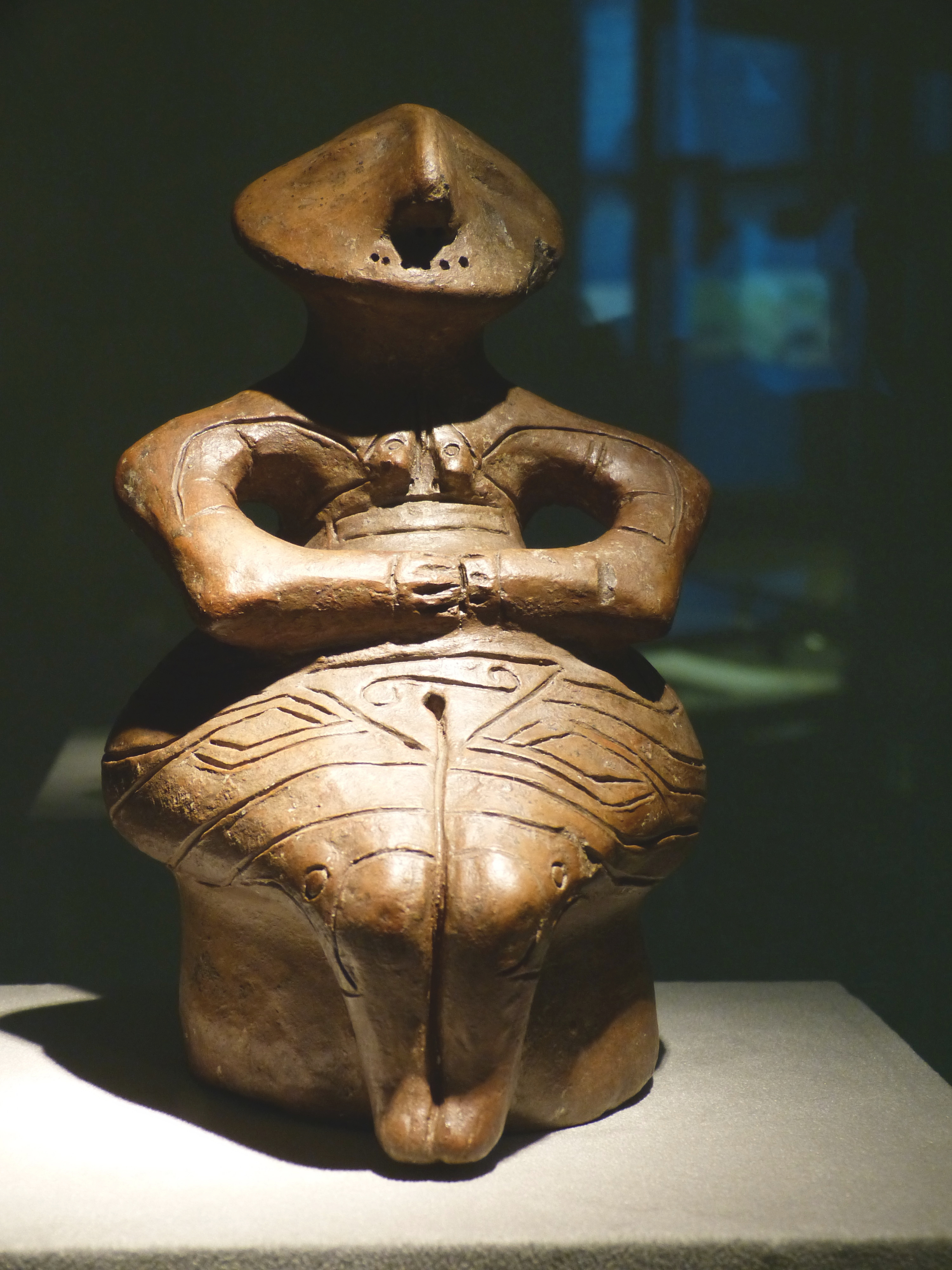
"Lady of Pazardžik" (c. 4500 BC)

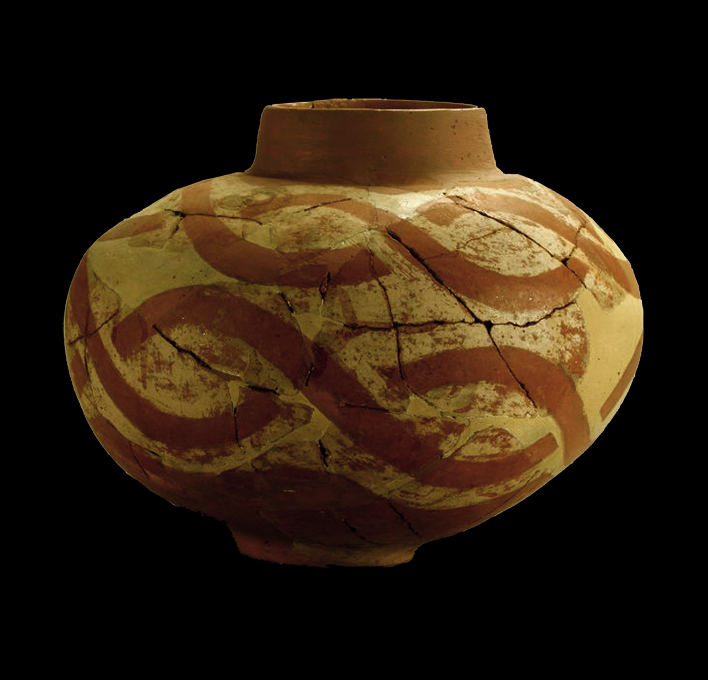
Pottery, 6th millennium BC (Karanovo I).

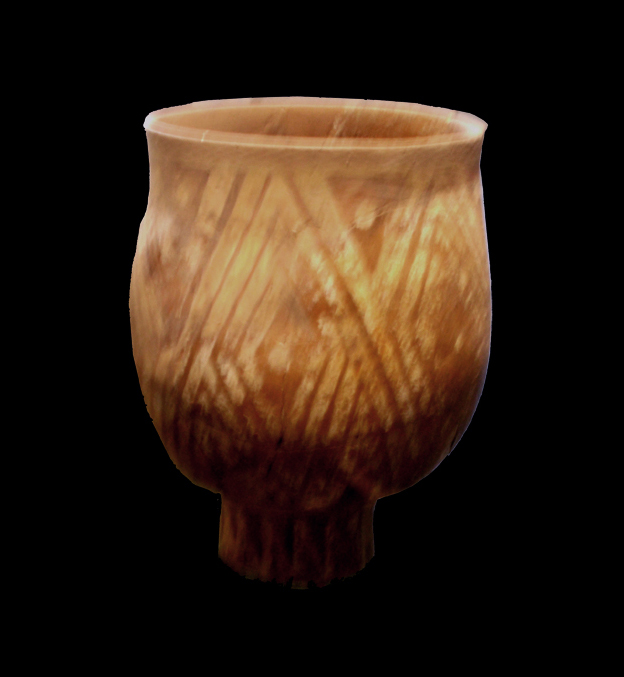
Tulip vase, 6th mill. BC (Karanovo I).

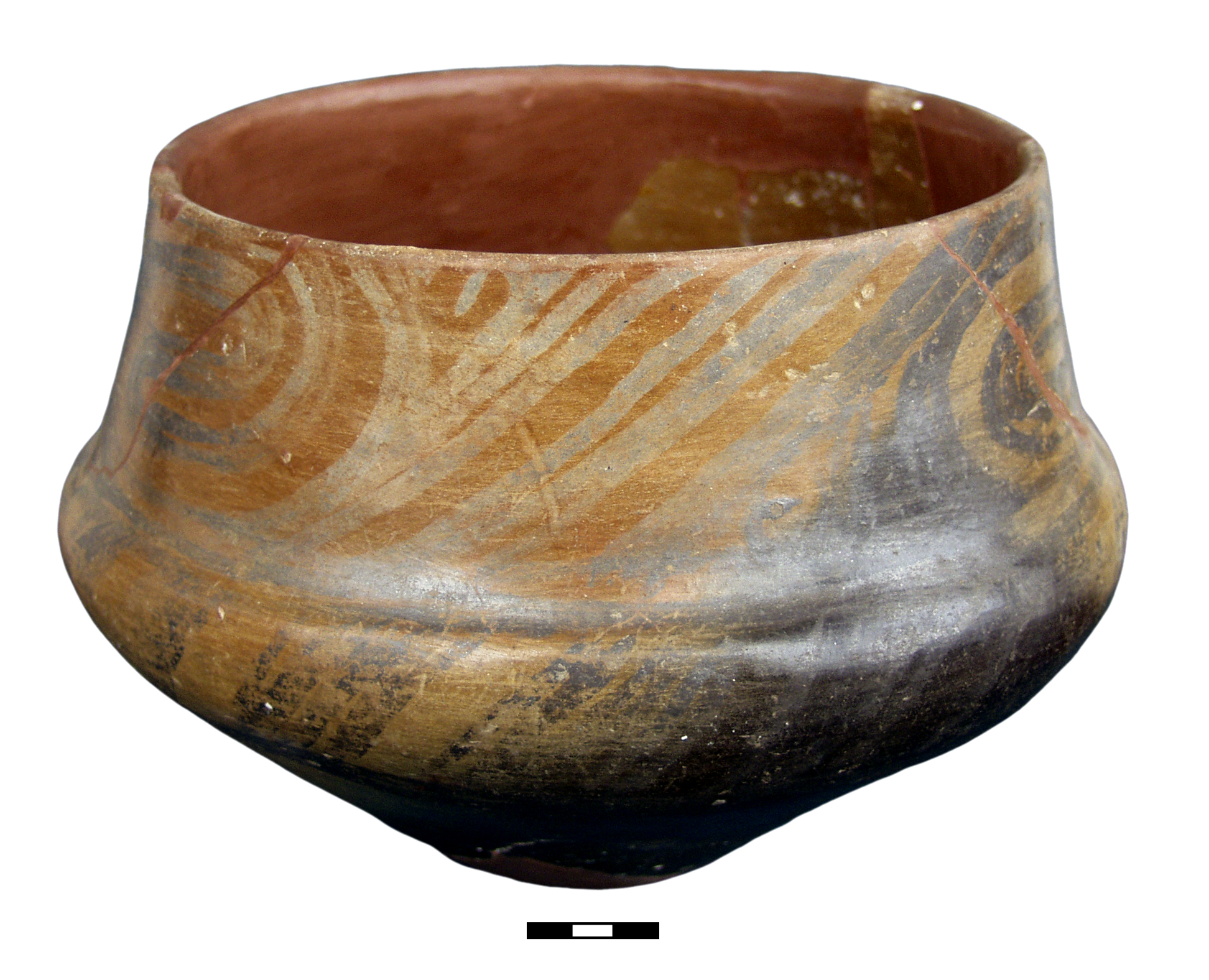
Ceramic vessel from Slatino

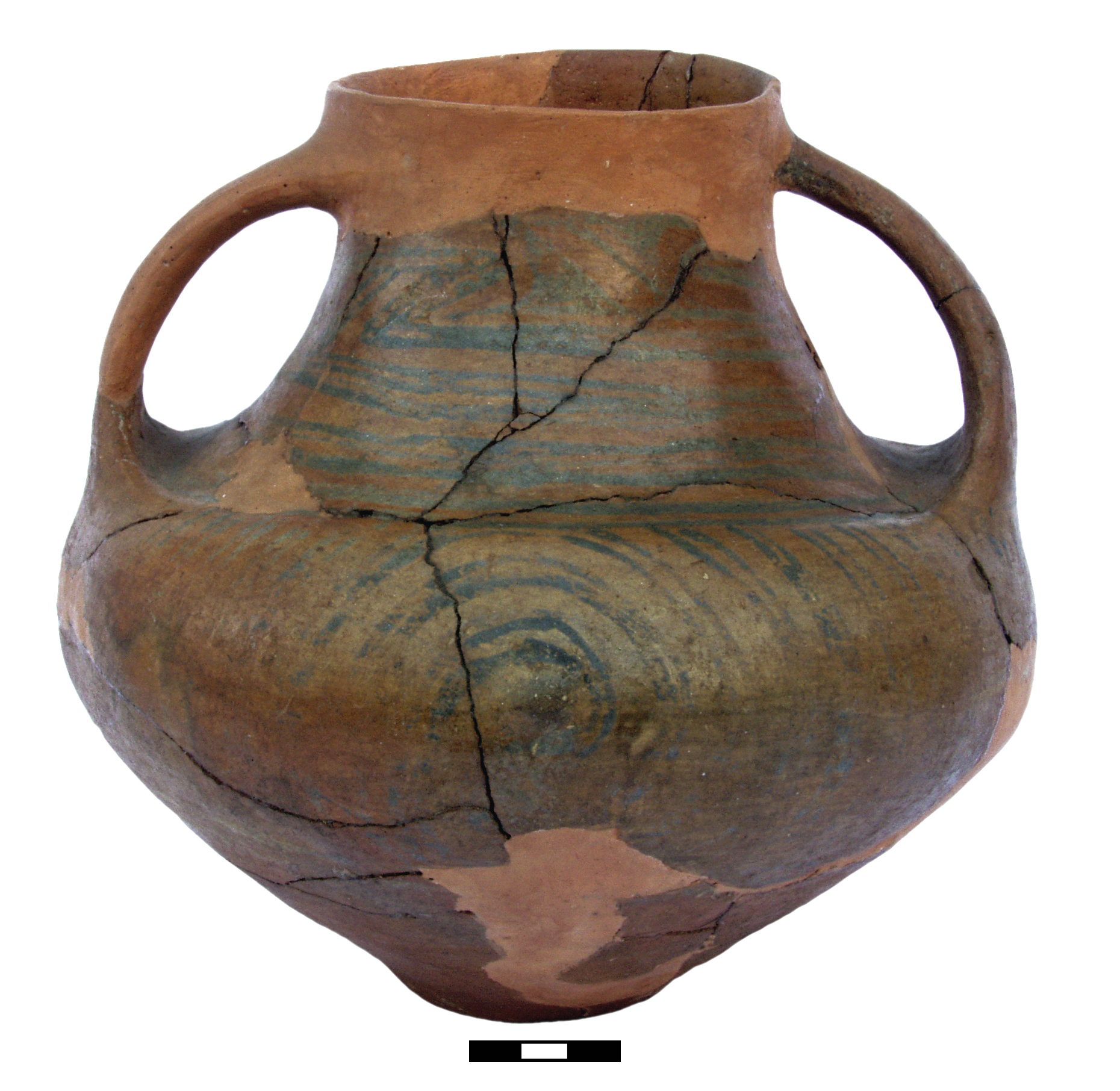
Ceramic vessel, 5th mill. BC (Slatino-Dikili Tass).

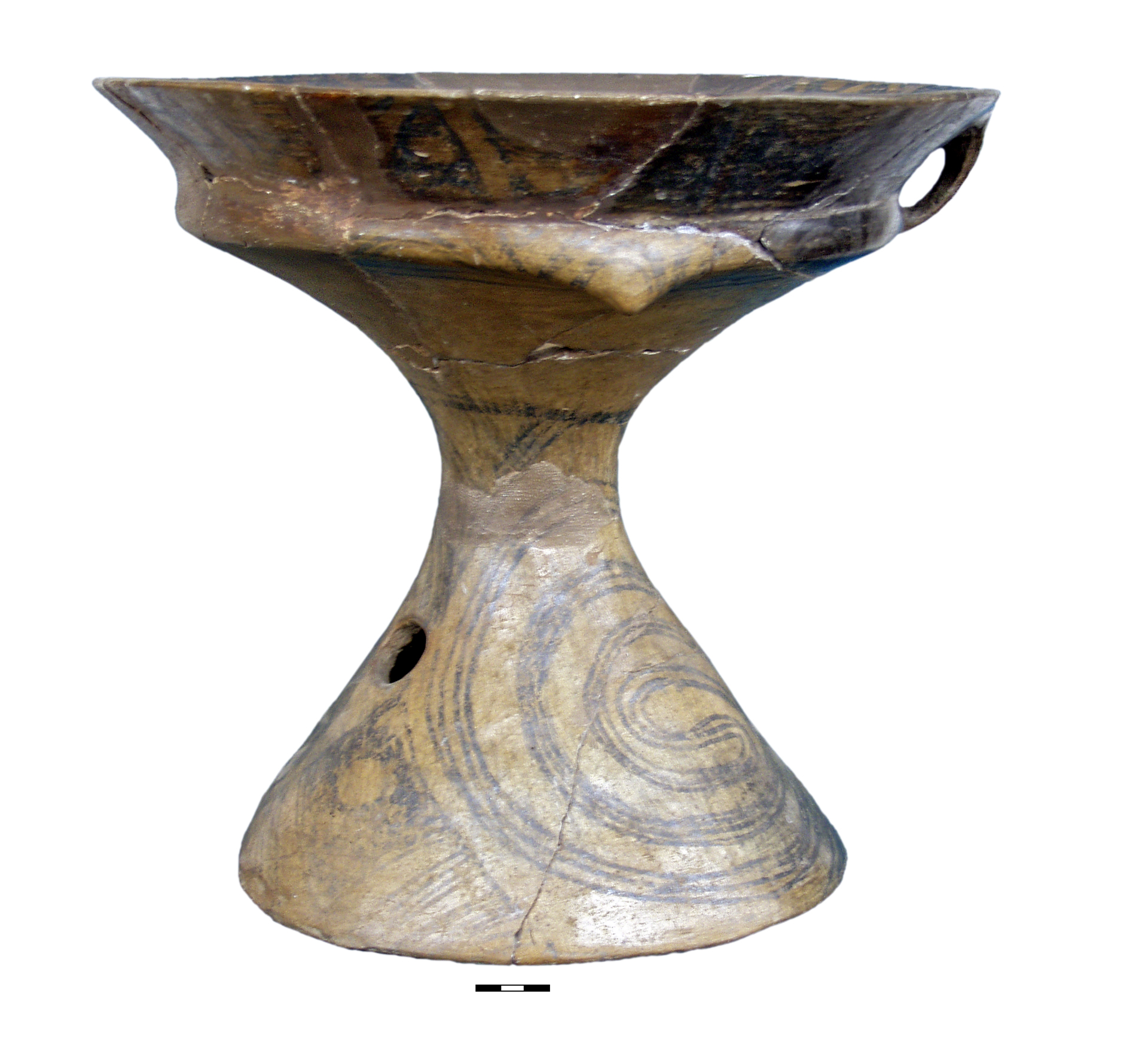
Pottery from Slatino

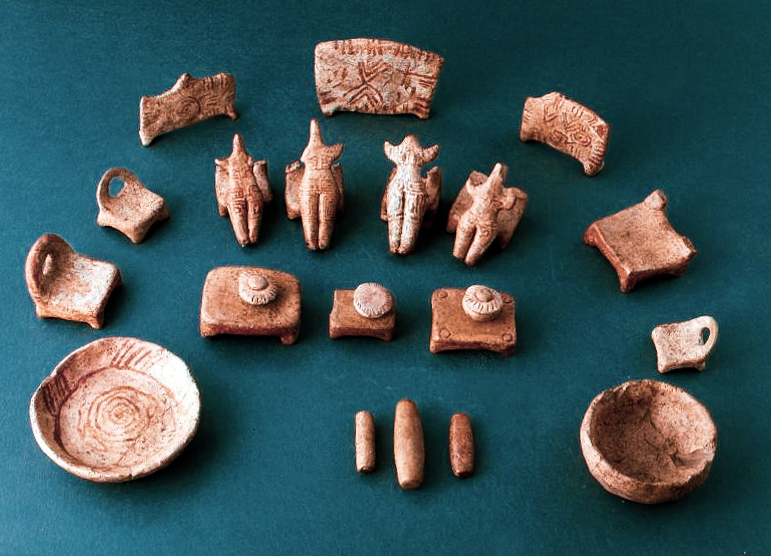
Cult scene, 5th mill. BC (Karanovo VI).

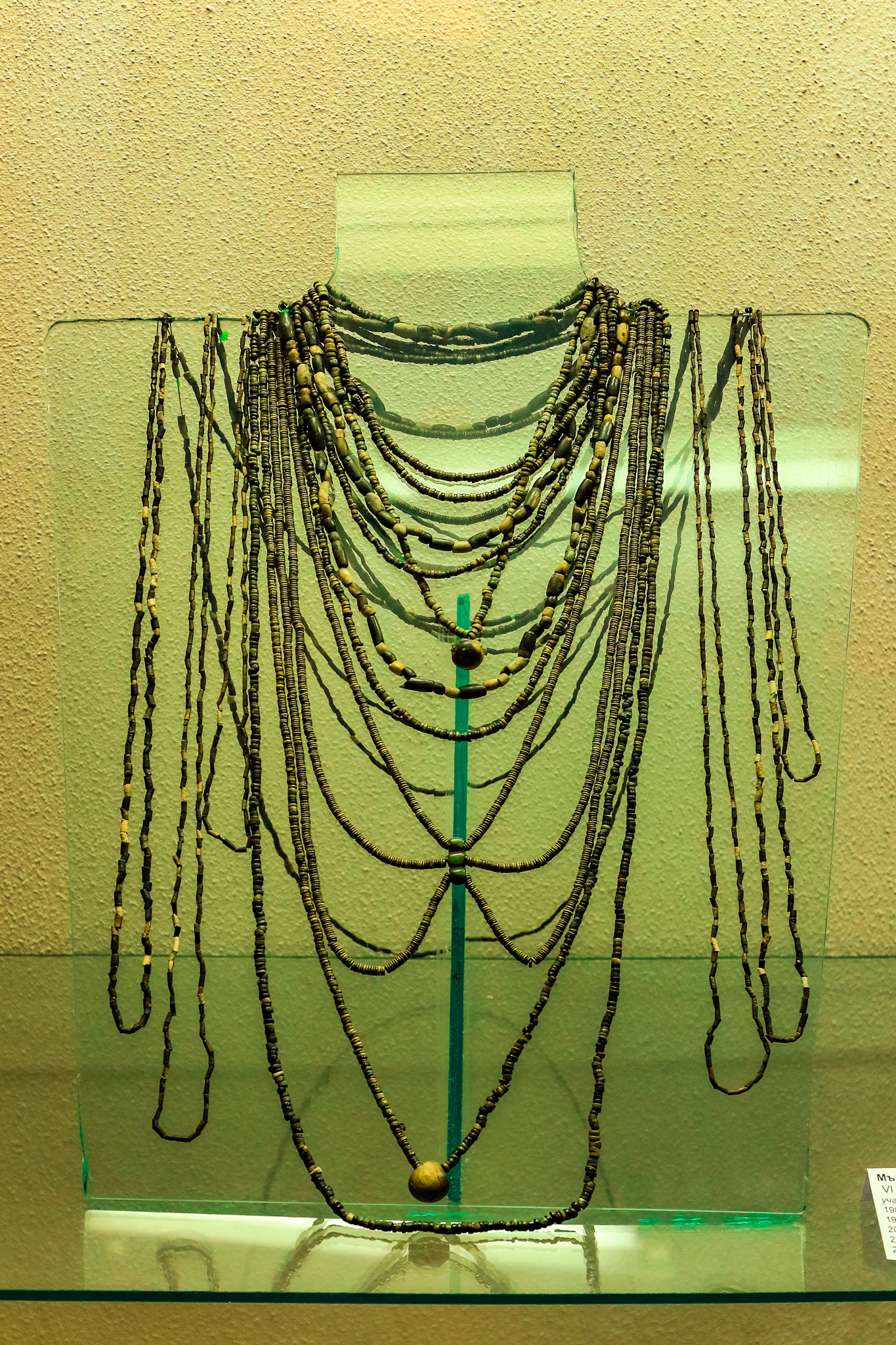
Necklace from Galabnik, 6th millennium BC (Galabnik Culture).

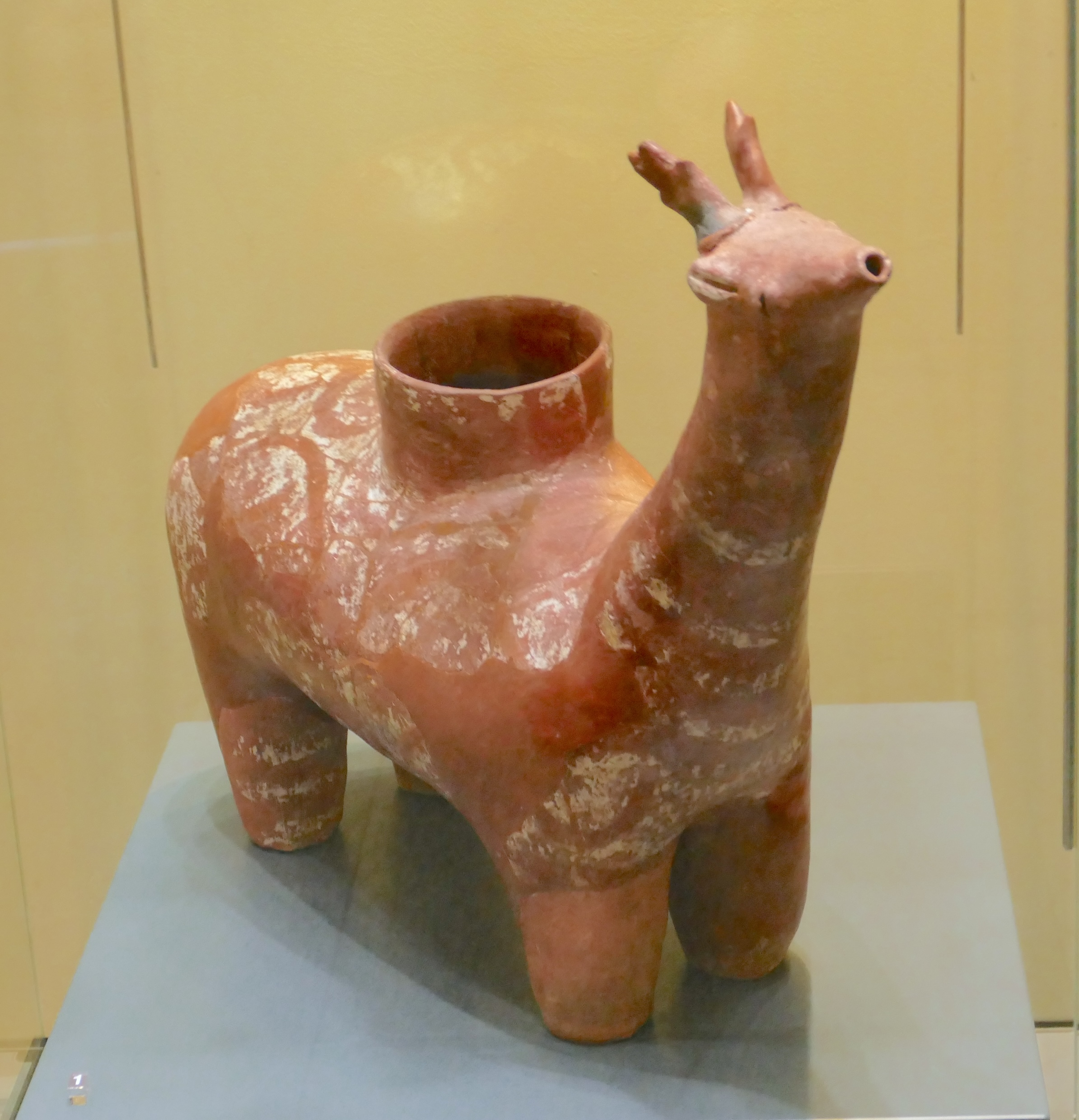
Zoomorphic ceramic vessel from Muldava

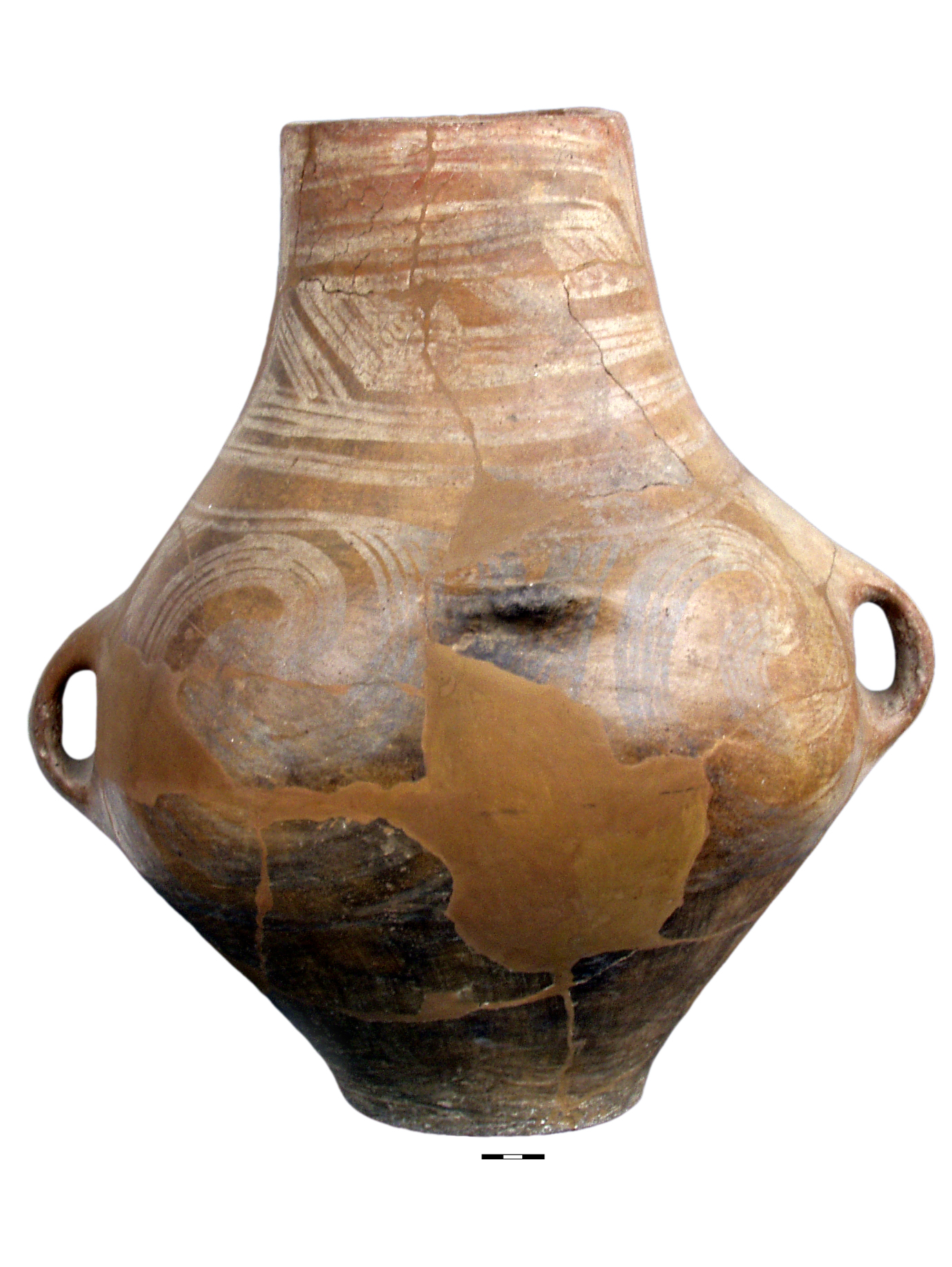
Pottery from Slatino

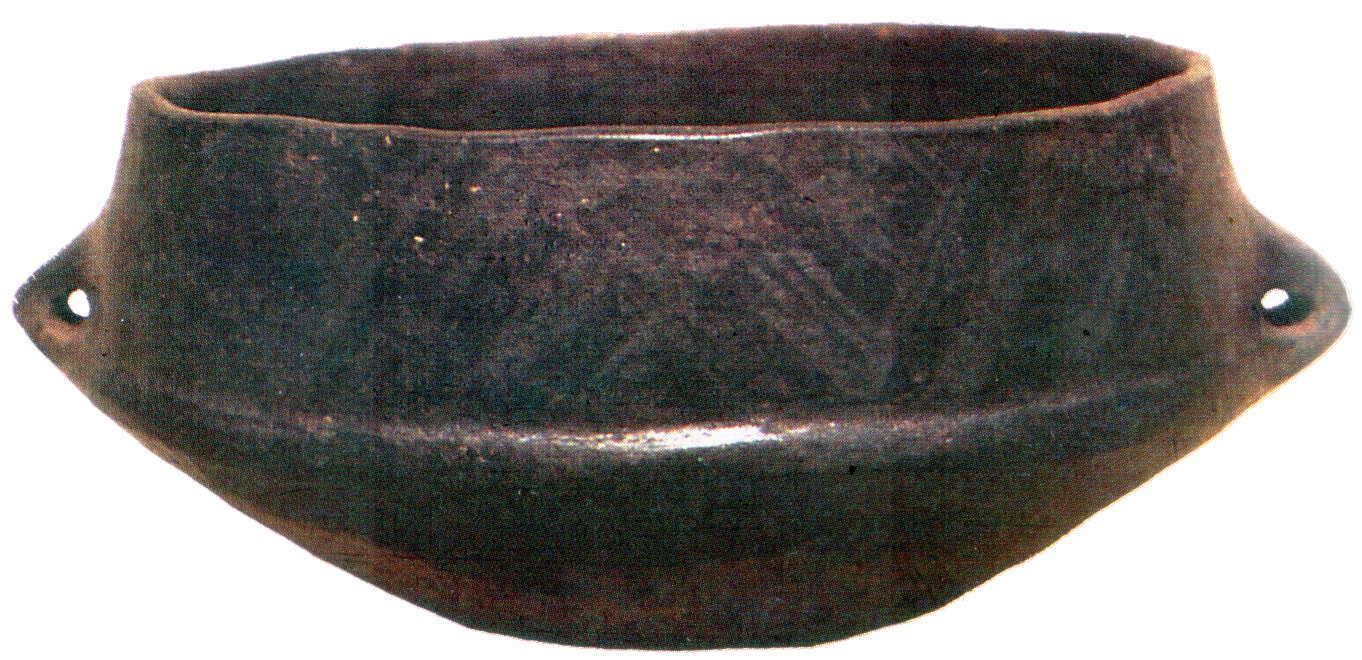
Pottery from Djakovo

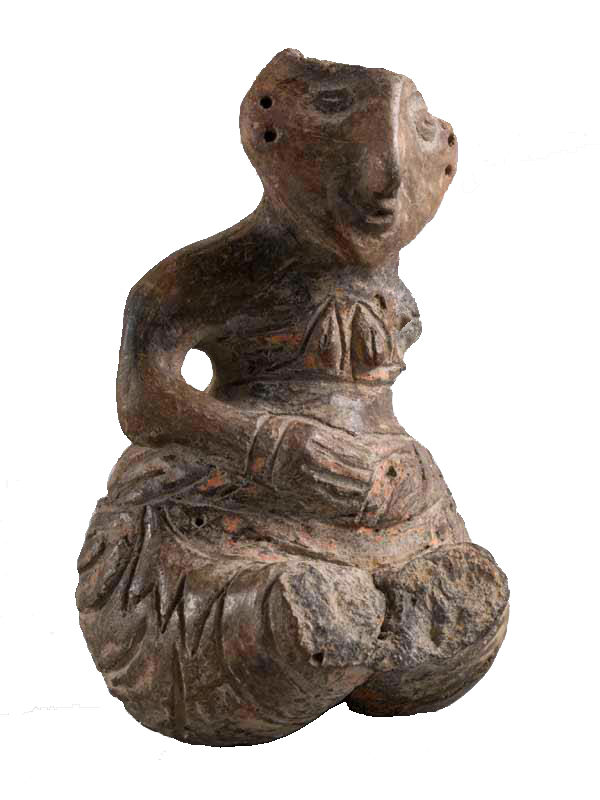
Ceramic figurine from Slatino

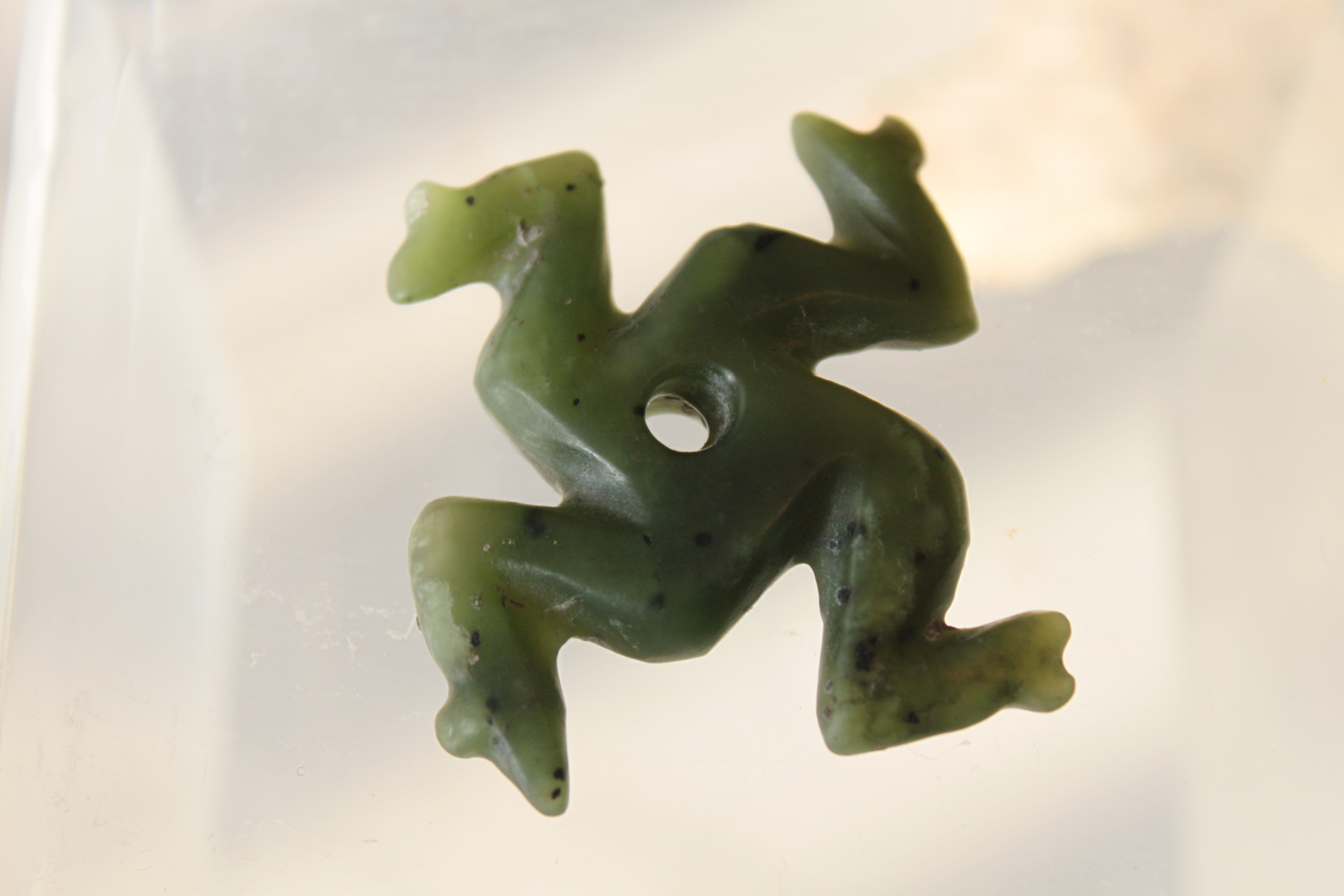
Jade amulet from Kardzali, 6th mill. BC (Karanovo I).

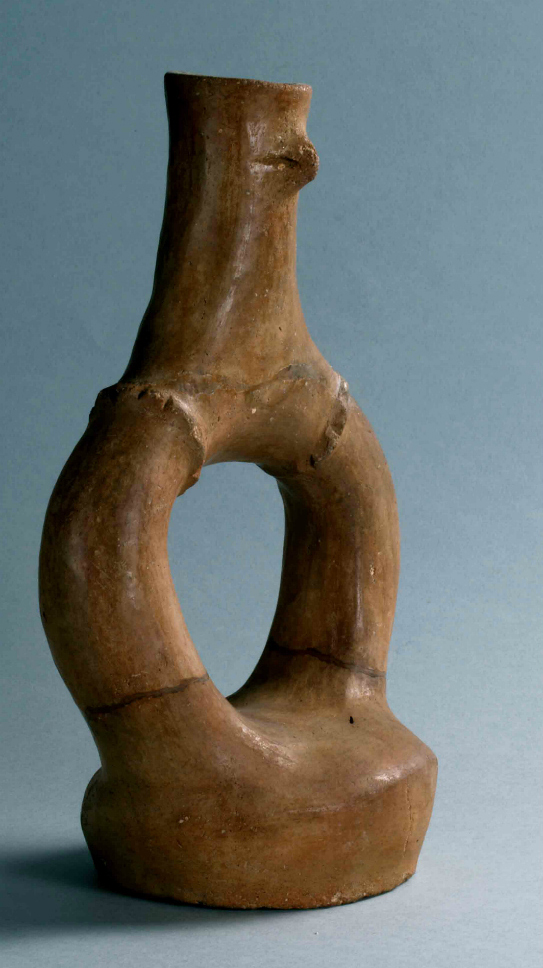
Anthropomorphic vessel, 6th-5th mill. BC (Karanovo III-IV).

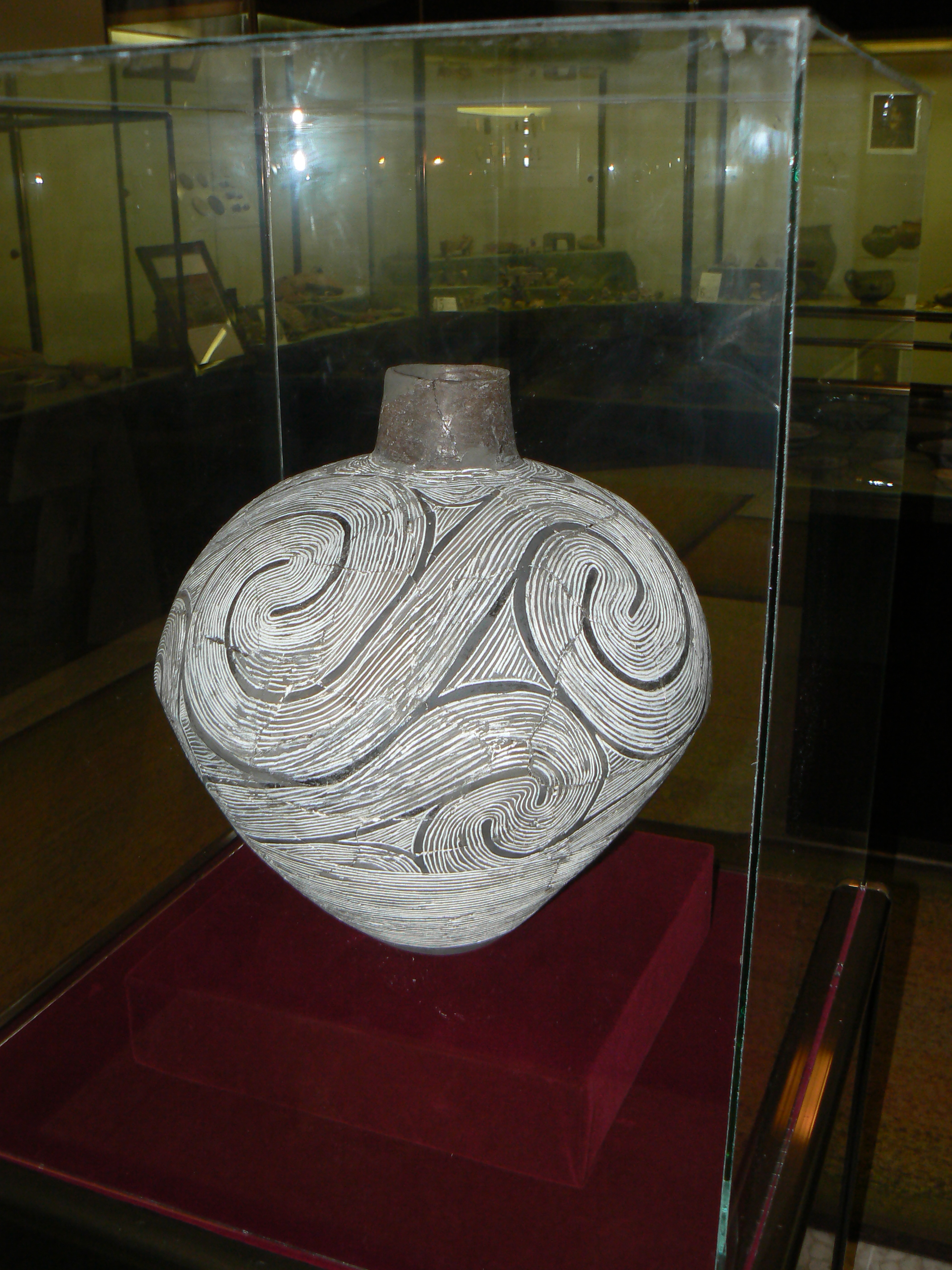
Pottery

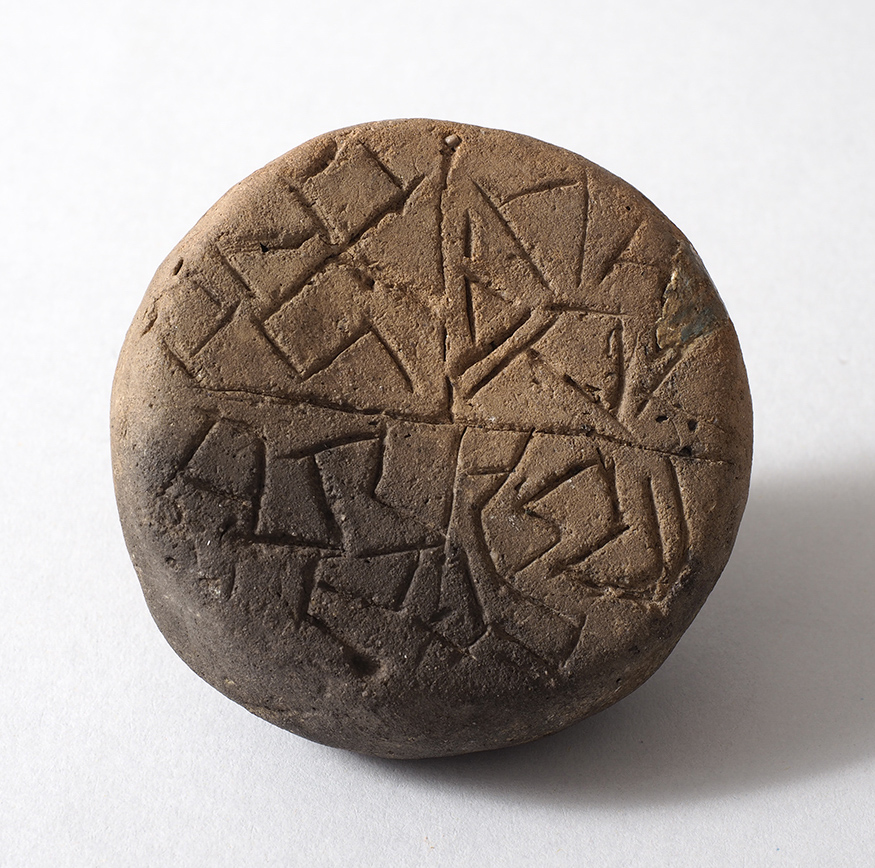
Clay 'stamp' with inscribed markings

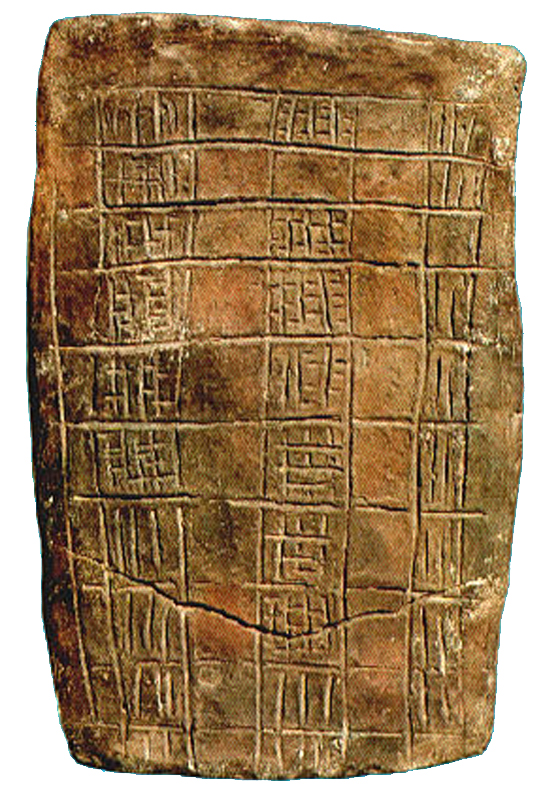
Inscribed object from Slatino with possible numerical meaning.

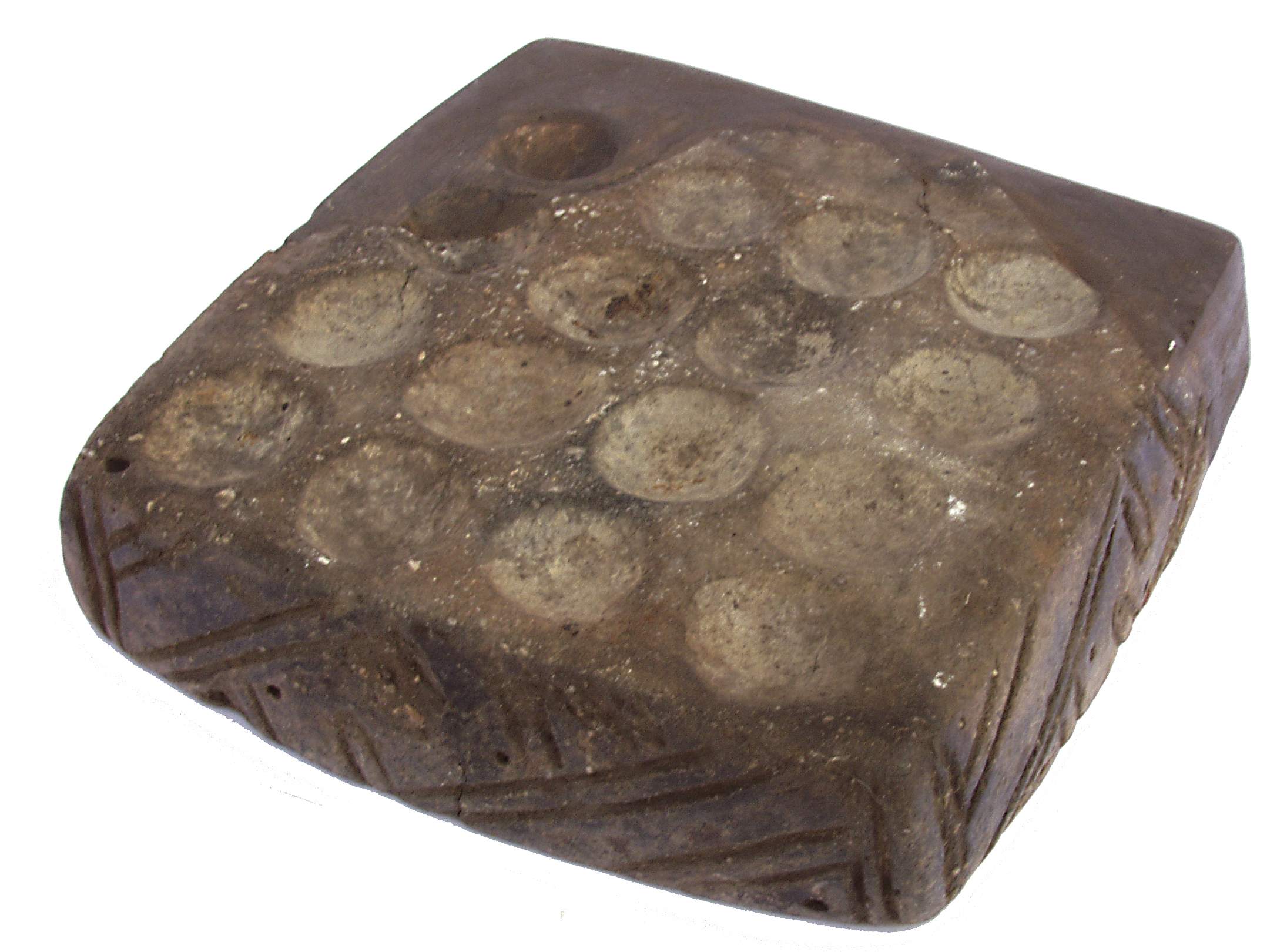
Ceramic object from Slatino

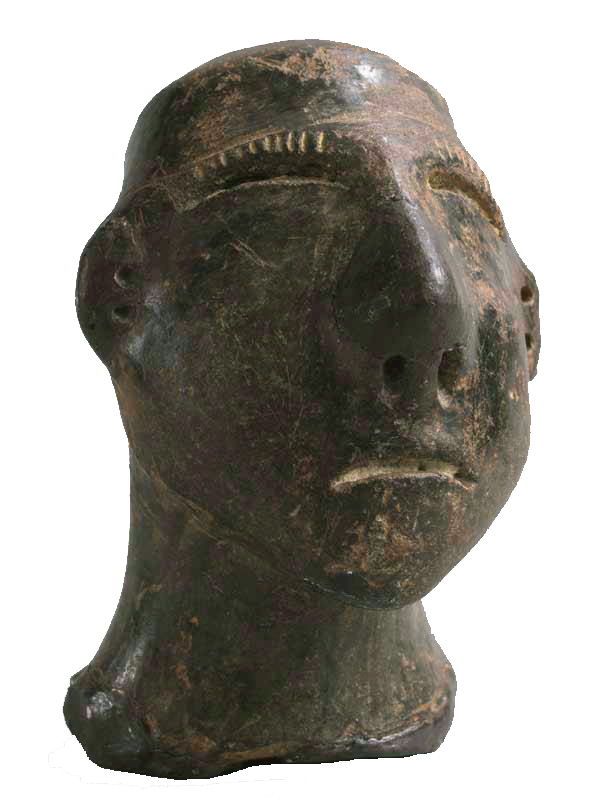
Ceramic head

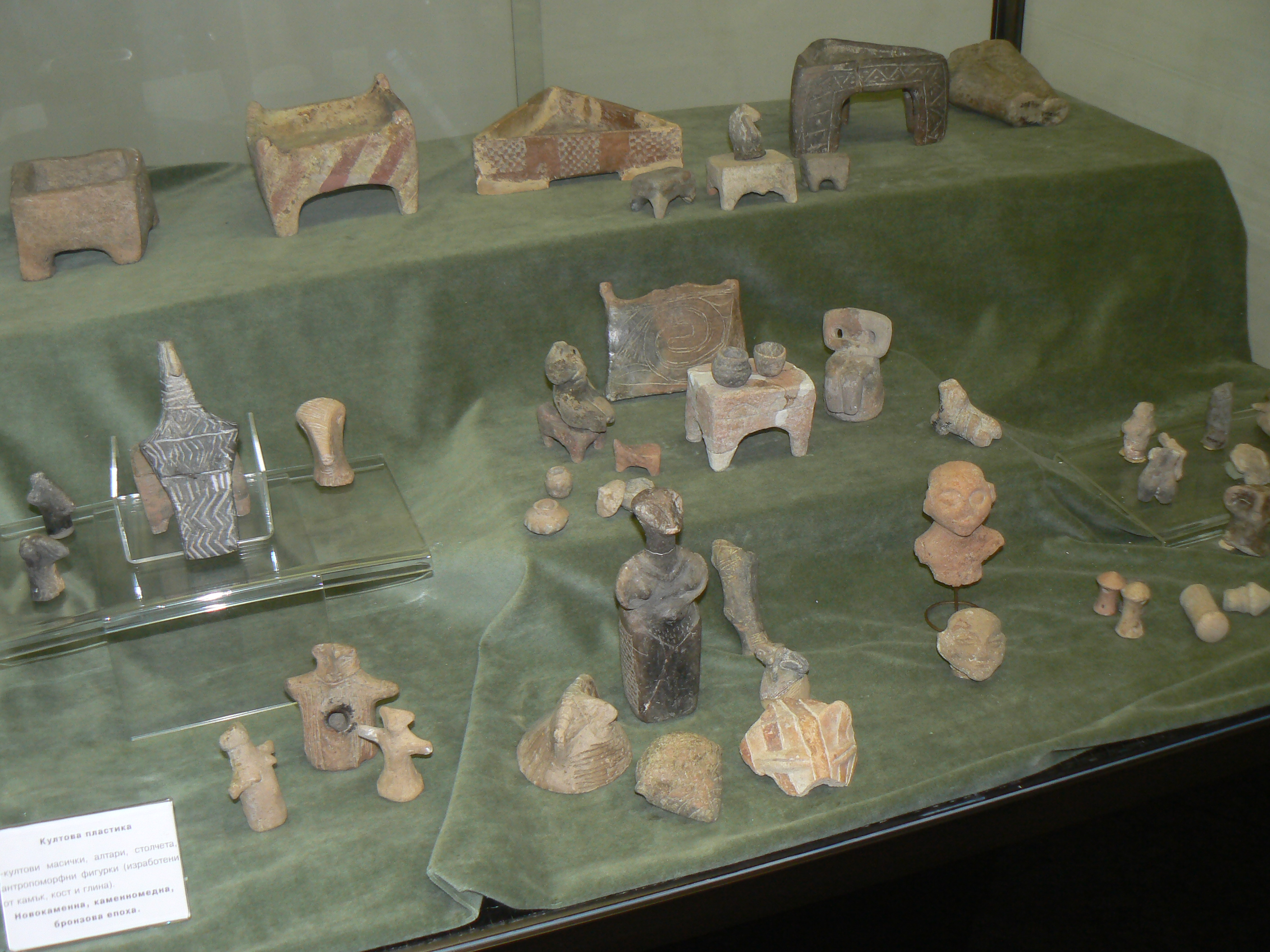
Various artefacts

=== Settlements ===
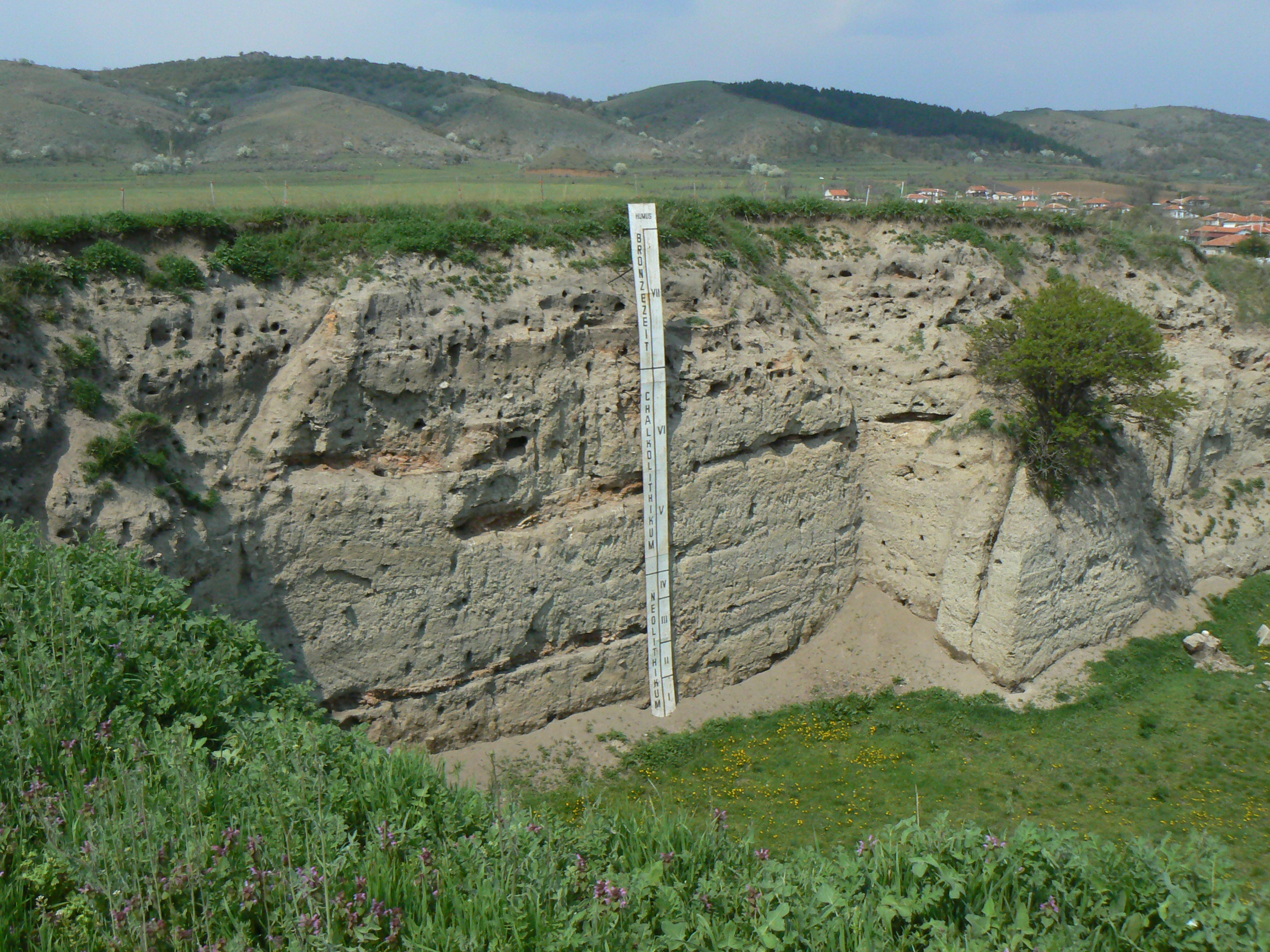
Karanovo tell, Bulgaria, excavation stratigraphy.

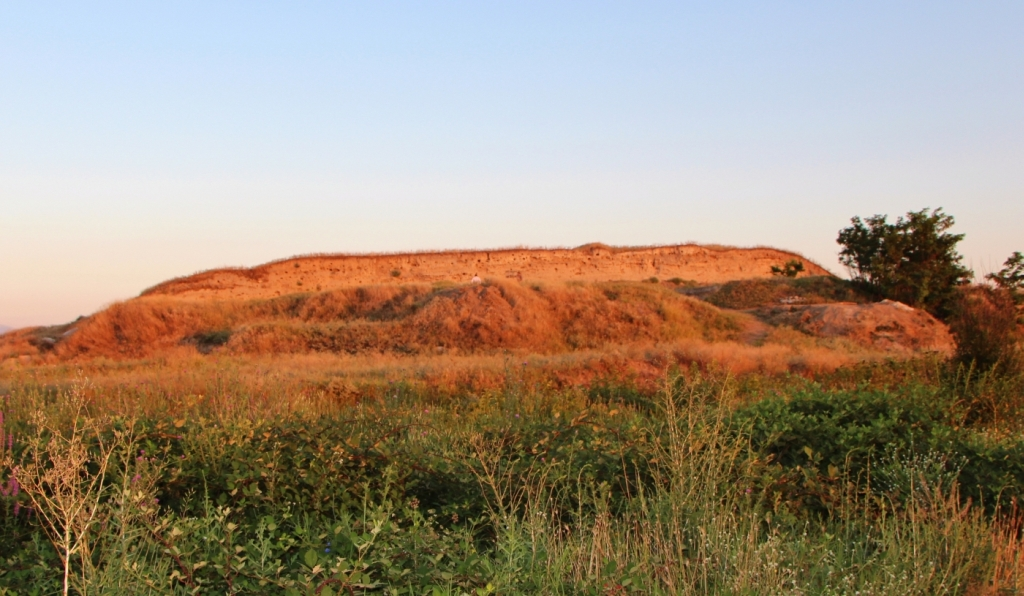
Tell Yunatsite, Bulgaria.

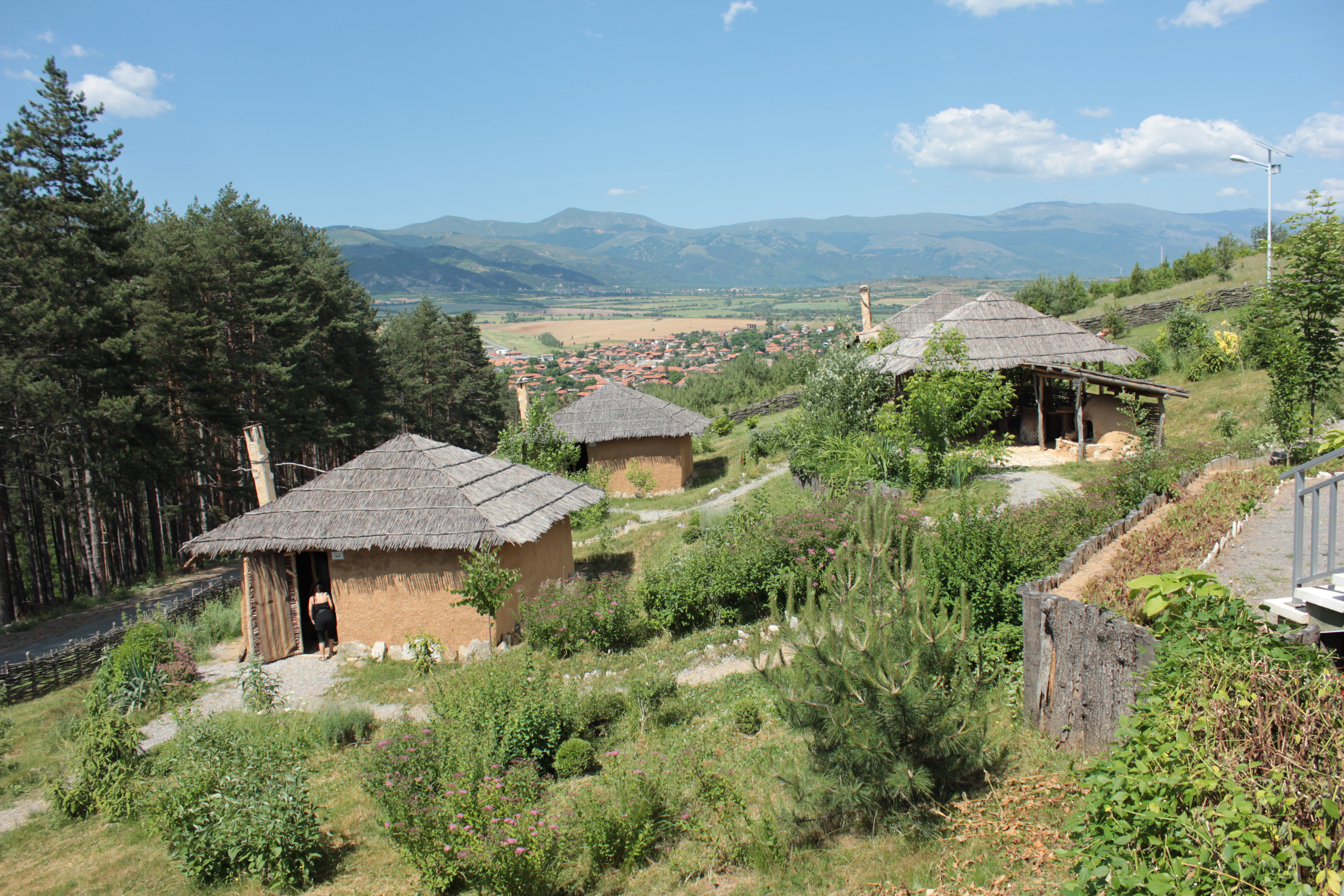
Neolithic house reconstructions, Chavdar, Bulgaria, c. 5000 BC.

== See also ==
- Old Europe
- Prehistoric Europe
- Gumelnița–Kodžadermen-Karanovo VI complex
- Durankulak
- Tell Yunatsite
- List of ancient cities in Thrace and Dacia
- Perperikon
- Seuthopolis

== Literature ==
- Stefan Hiller, Vassil Nikolov (eds.), Karanovo III. Beiträge zum Neolithikum in Südosteuropa Österreichisch-Bulgarische Ausgrabungen und Forschungen in Karanovo, Band III, Vienna (2000), ISBN 3-901232-19-2.
