= Alföld culture =

Alföld culture may refer to several archaeological cultures of the Great Hungarian Plain (Alföld) including:

- an eastern sub-group of the Neolithic Linear Pottery culture circa 5330 – 4940 BCE
- the Late Neolithic Tisza culture circa 4900 – 4450 BCE
- the Bronze Age Ottomány culture circa 2100 – 1600 BCE
