= Tiszapolgár culture =

4500–4000 BC European archaeological culture

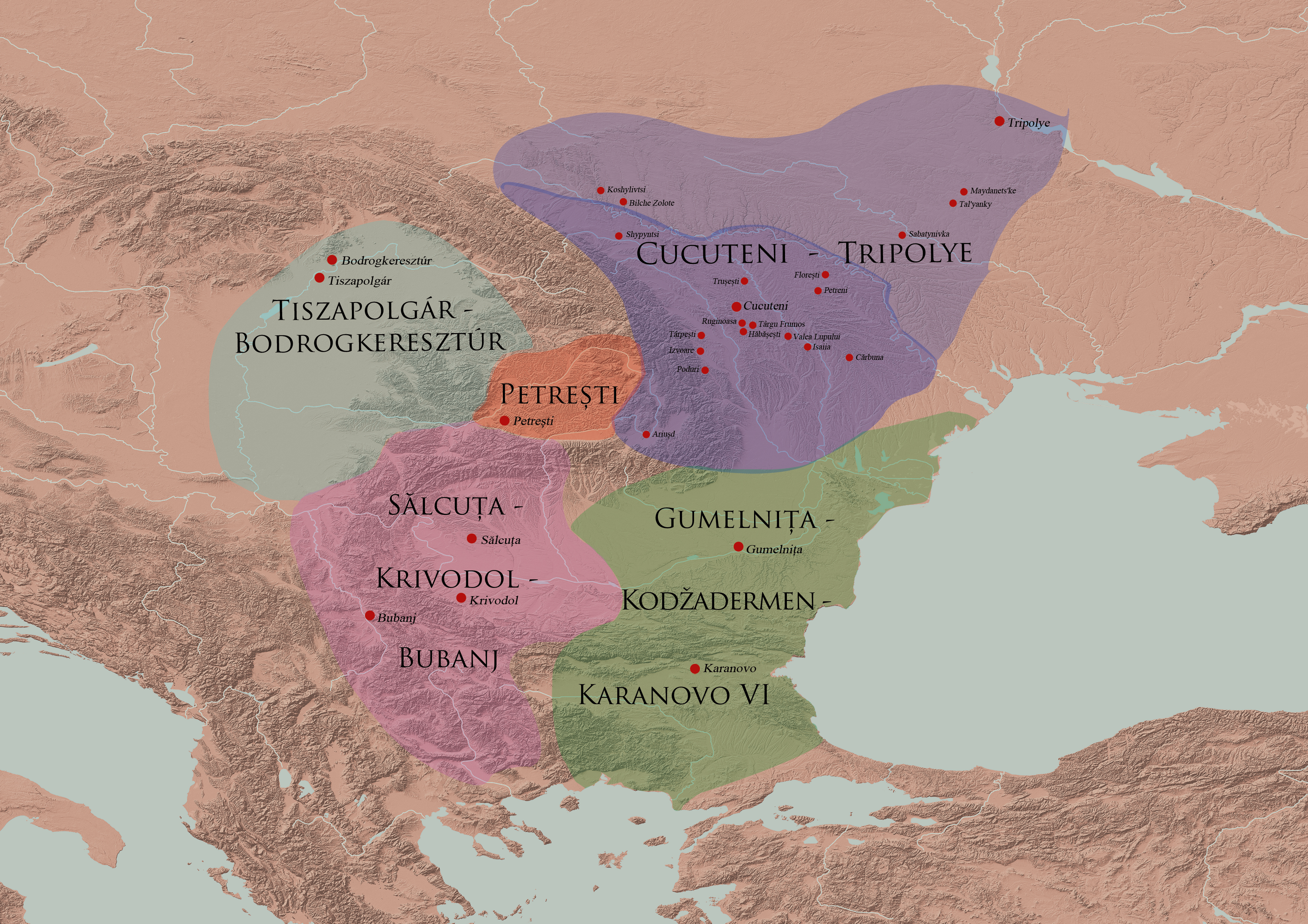
- Horizon: Old Europe
- Period: Eneolithic, Chalcolithic
- Dates: 4500-4000 BC
- Preceded by: Tisza culture, Vinča culture
- Followed by: Bodrogkeresztúr culture

The Tiszapolgár culture (4500–4000 BC) was an Eneolithic archaeological culture in Central Europe in the Carpathian Basin, in the Great Hungarian Plain. It was located in the territory of present-day Eastern Hungary, Eastern Slovakia, the Transcarpathian region of Ukraine, and Western Romania.

The type site Tiszapolgár-Basatanya is a town in northeastern Hungary (Polgár). It is a continuation of the earlier Neolithic Tisza culture. The type site Româneşti is located in the Româneşti-Tomeşti, Timiș County, Romania.

Most of the information about the Tiszapolgár culture comes from cemeteries; over 150 individual graves have been being excavated at Tiszapolgár-Basatanya. The pottery is unpainted but often polished and frequently decorated.

In 2022 a trove of 169 gold rings was found in Romania, in the burial of a high-status woman belonging to the Tiszapolgár culture. The trove was described as "a sensational find for the period".

== Genetics ==
Lipson et al. (2017) found in the remains of five individuals ascribed to the Tiszapolgár culture three G2a2b and a subclade of it, and two I2a and a subclade of it. Of the five samples of mtDNA extracted, three belonged to T21c, one belonged to H26, and one belonged to H1. Genetics studies demonstrate that they are patriarchal.

== Gallery ==
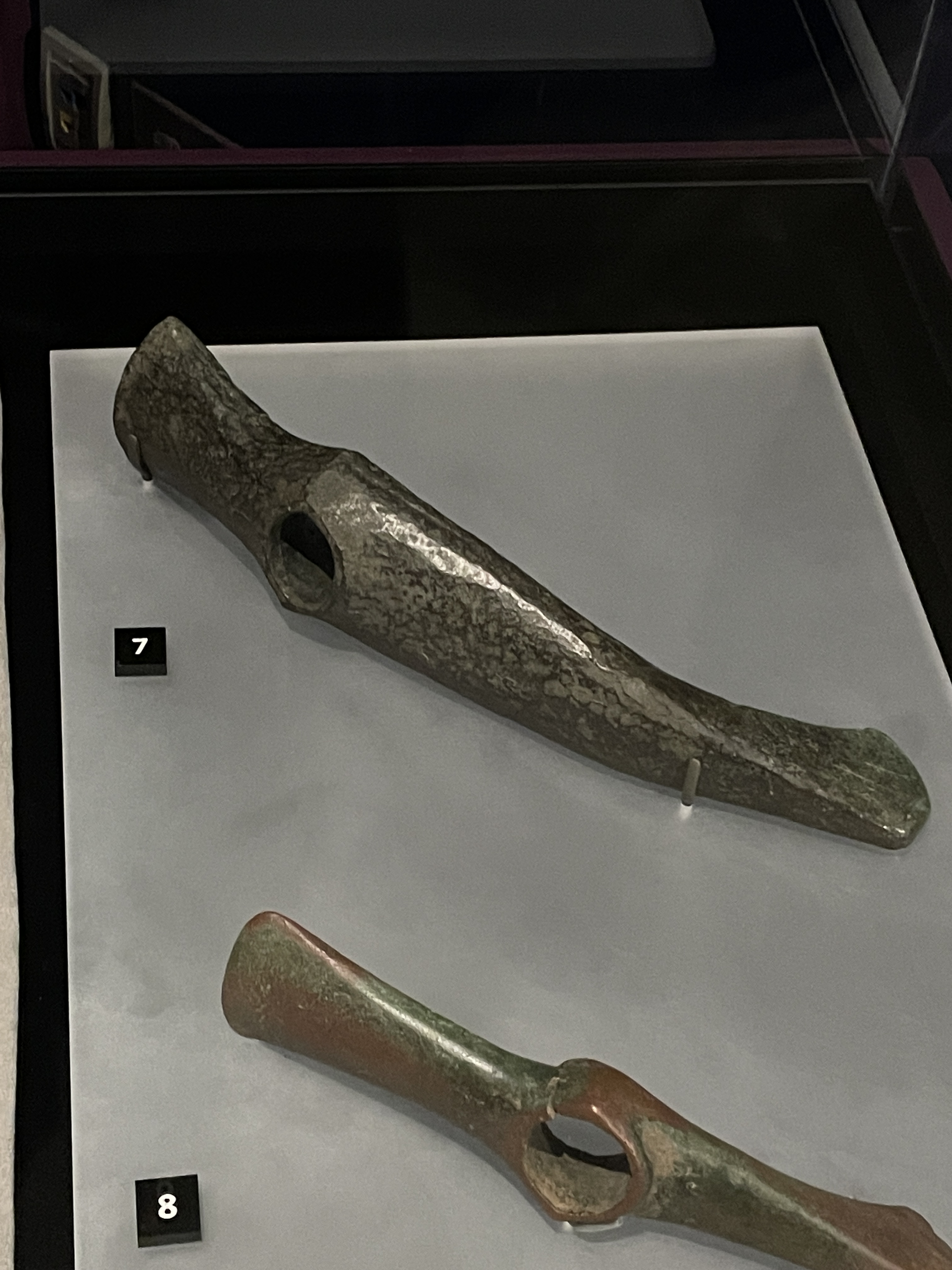
Copper axes

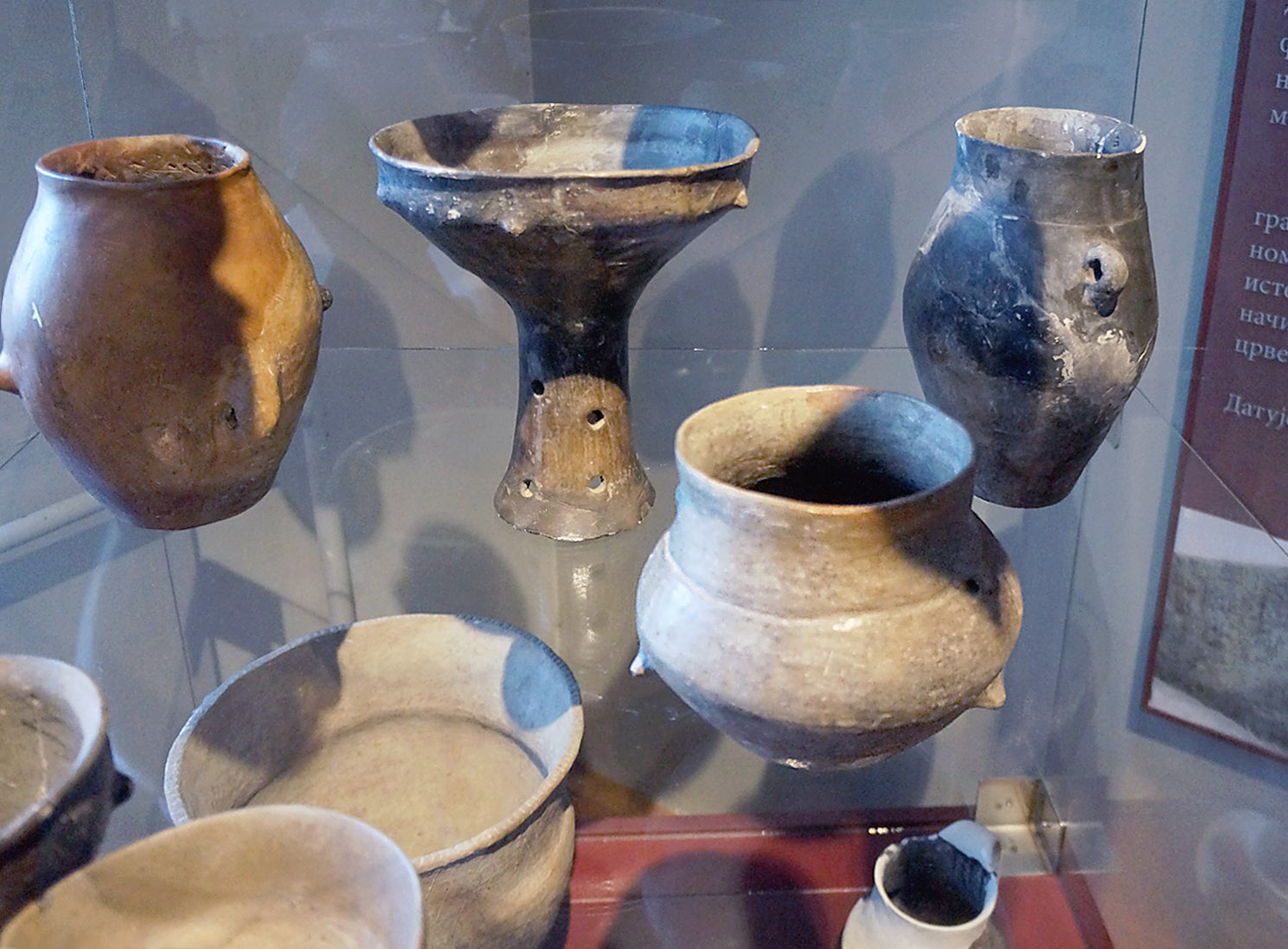
Tiszapolgar ceramics

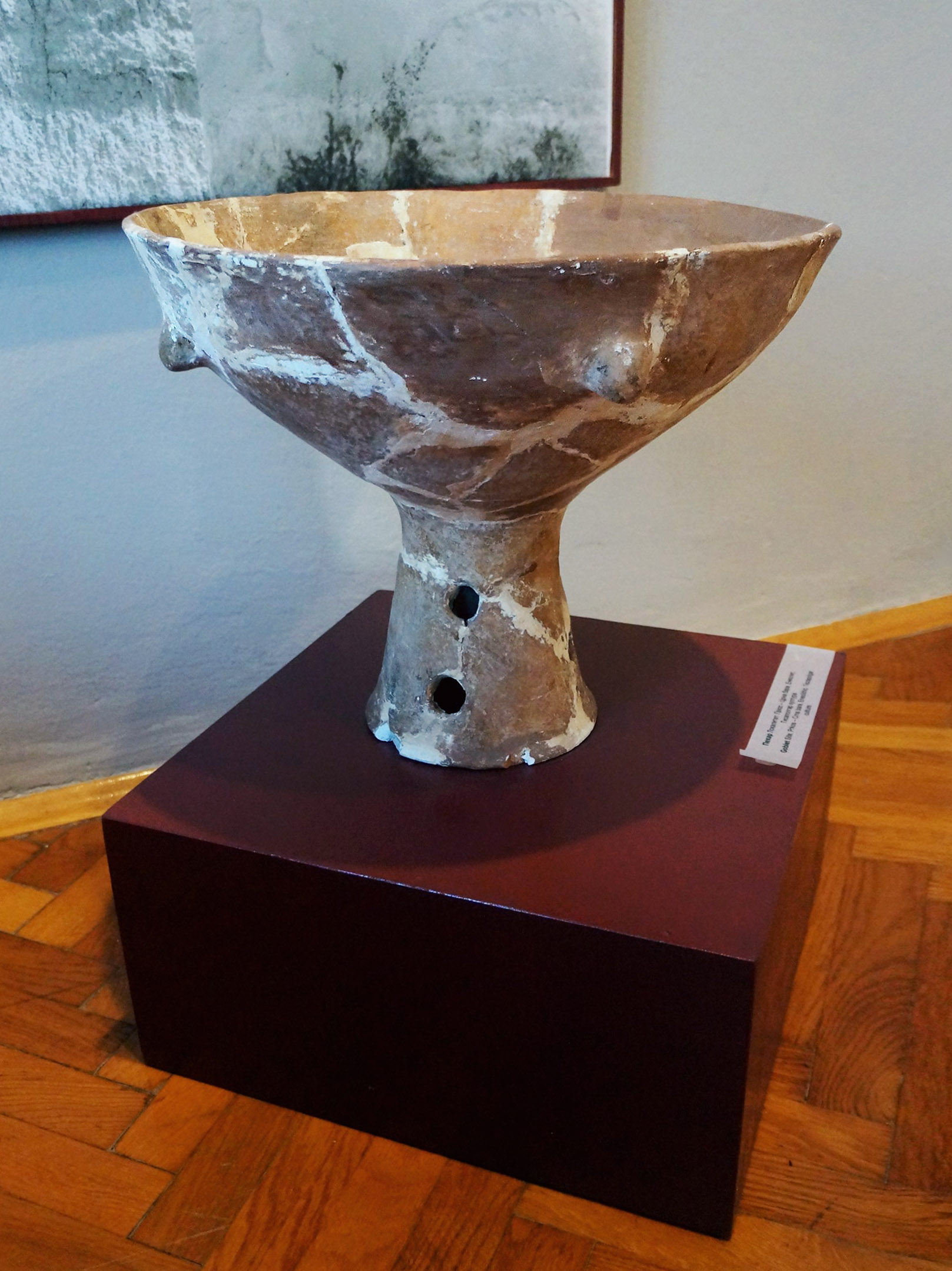
Tiszapolgar ceramic vessel

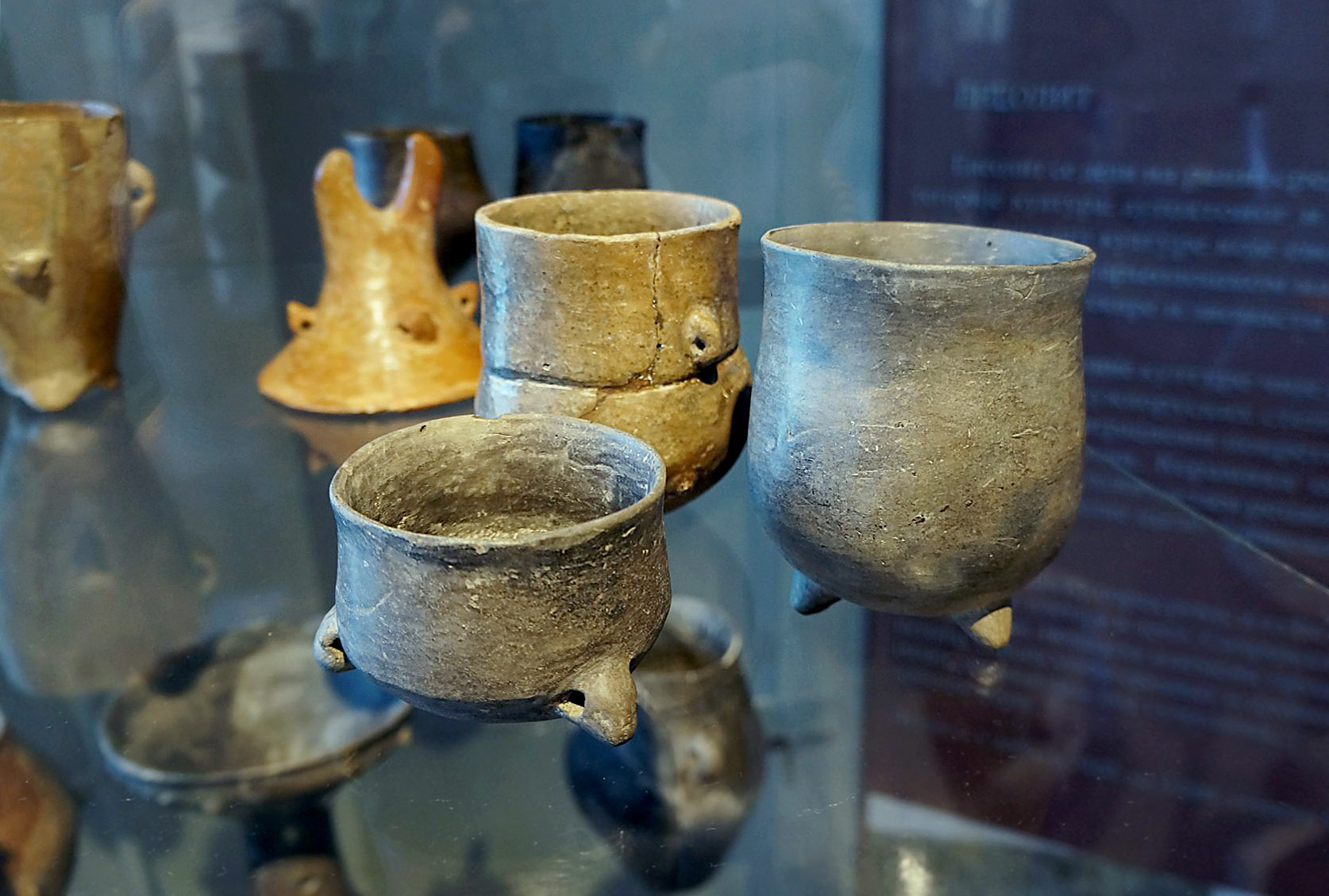
Ceramic cups

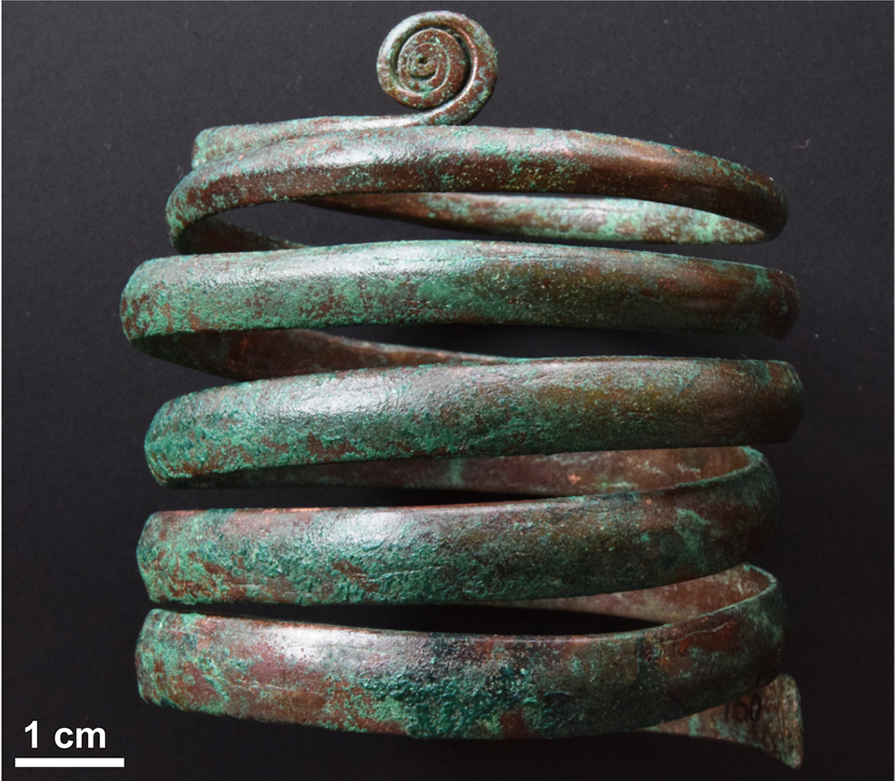
Copper bracelet

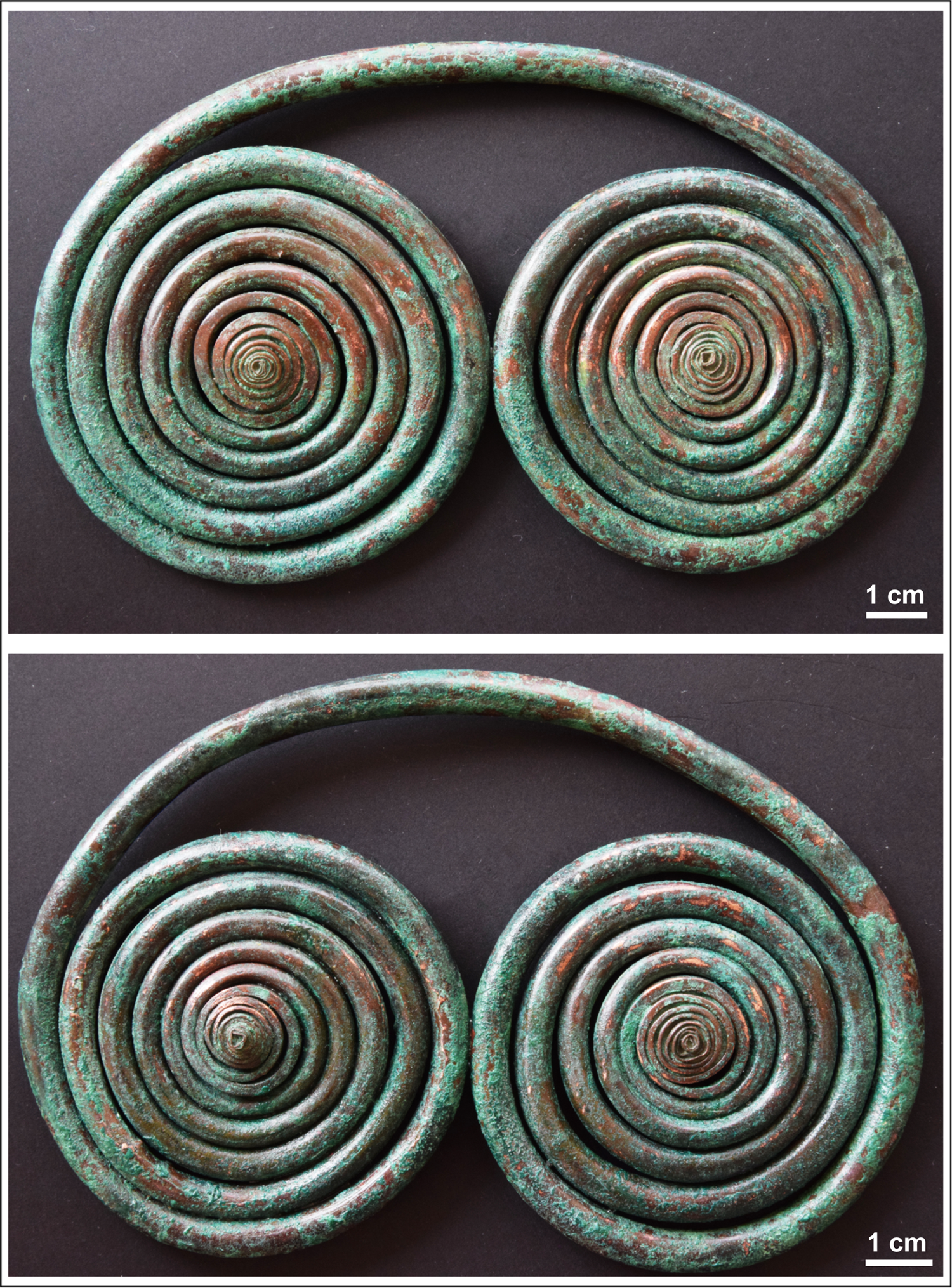
Copper spiral ornaments

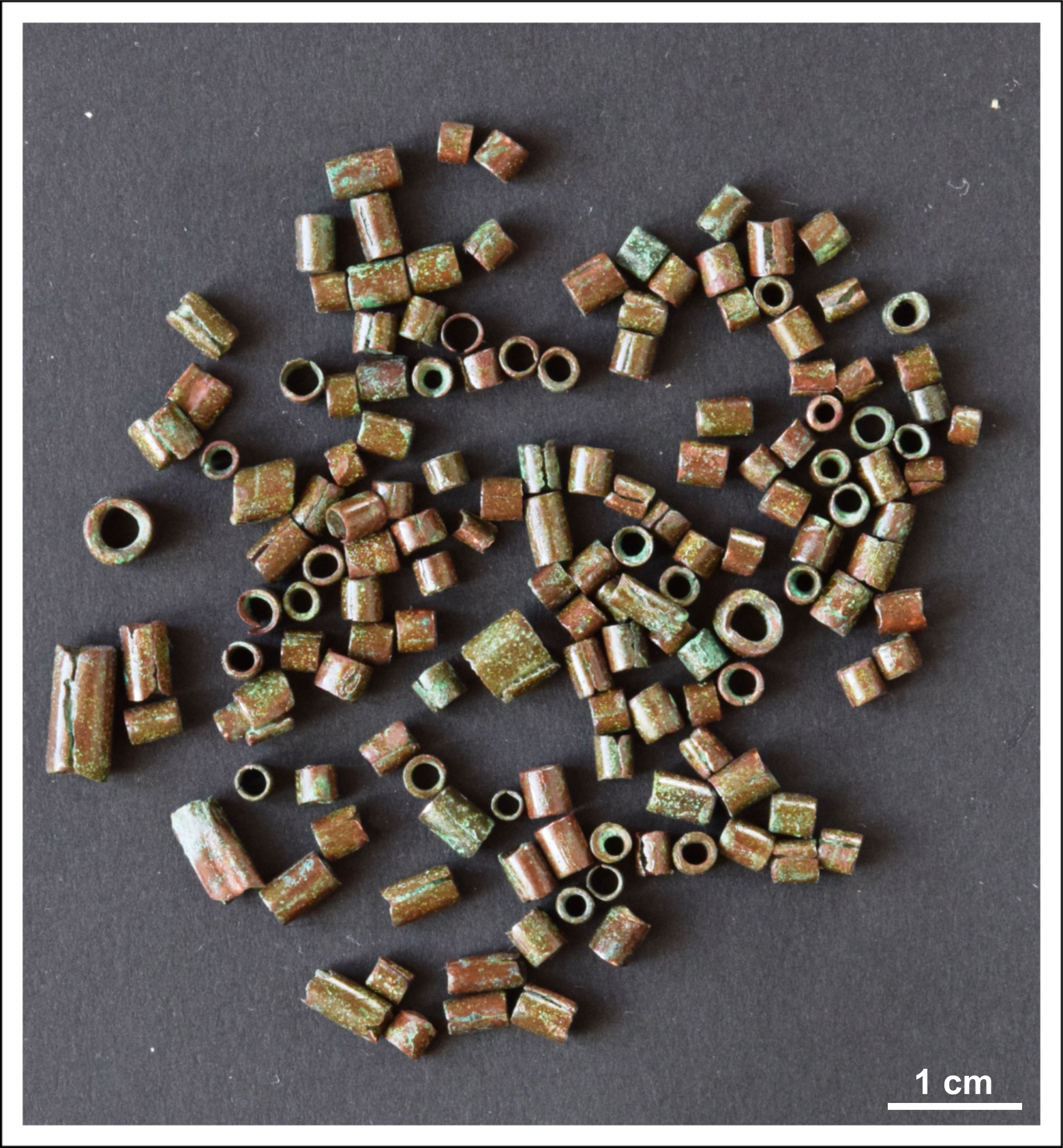
Copper beads

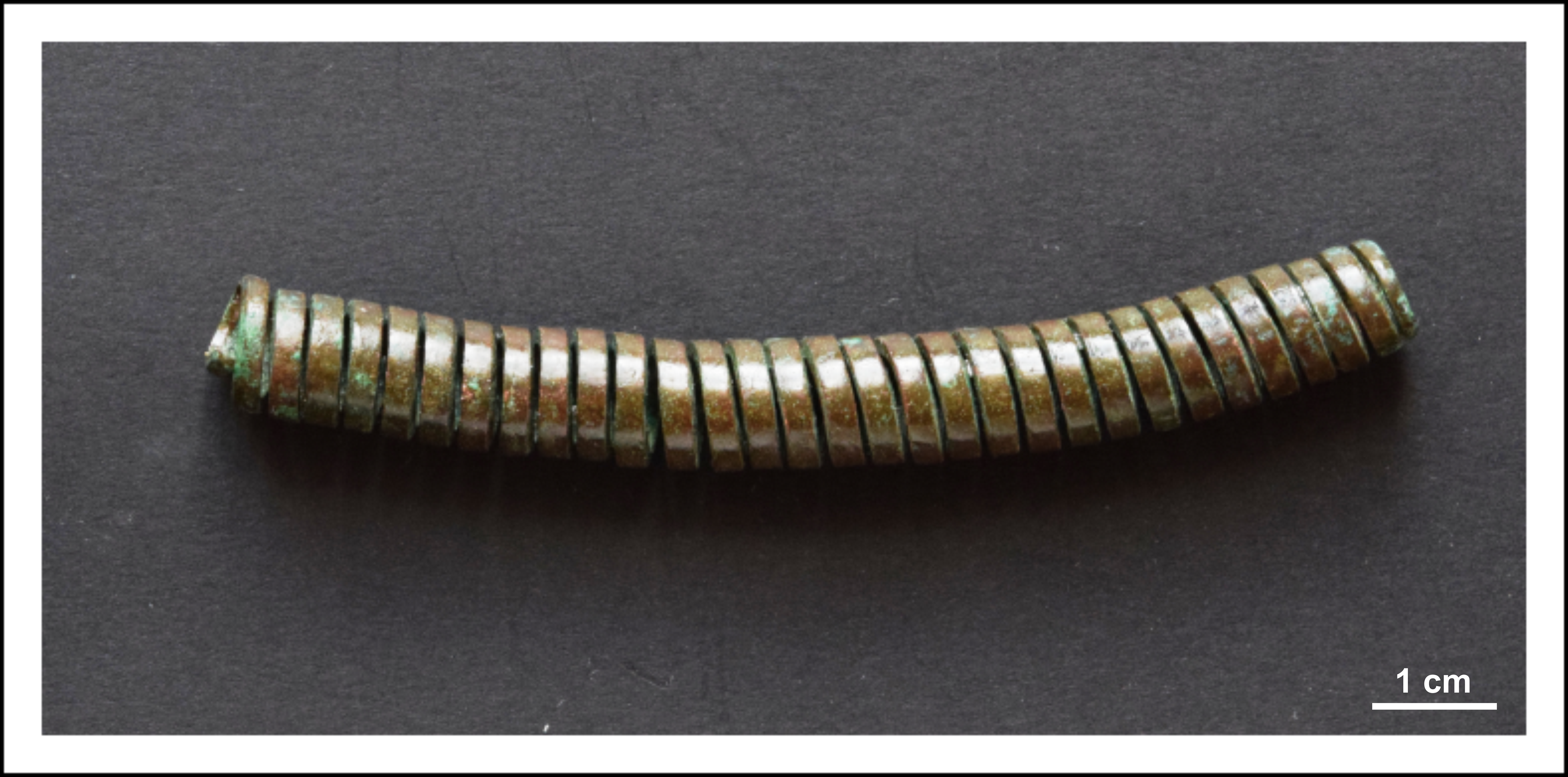
Copper spiral ornament

== See also ==
- Prehistory of Transylvania

== Bibliography ==
- Lipson, Mark (November 16, 2017). "Parallel palaeogenomic transects reveal complex genetic history of early European farmers". Nature. 551 (7680). Nature Research: 368–372. Bibcode:2017Natur.551..368L. doi:10.1038/nature24476. PMC 5973800. PMID 29144465.
- Narasimhan, Vagheesh M. (September 6, 2019). "The formation of human populations in South and Central Asia". Science. 365 (6457) eaat7487. American Association for the Advancement of Science. bioRxiv 10.1101/292581. doi:10.1126/science.aat7487. PMC 6822619. PMID 31488661.
- Parkinson, William A. (1999): The Social Organization of Early Copper Age Tribes on the Great Hungarian Plain. University of Michigan
- Parkinson, William A.: Style and Social Interaction in the Early Copper Age of the Great Hungarian Plain. La Tinaja: A Newsletter of Archaeological Ceramics. 13(1):4-7. Ohio State University
- Sarris, Apostolos; Galaty, Michael L.; Yerkes, Richard W.; Parkinson, William A.; Gyucha, Attila; Billingsley, Doc M. & Tate, Robert: Investigation of Hungarian Early Copper Age Settlements through Magnetic Prospection & Soil Phosphate Techniques
- Sauer, Erin: Paleomeander Behavior in the Early Copper Age of the Great Hungarian Plain: Vészt″o, Hungary. The Ohio State University
- The Stone – Copper Age /The Eneolithic Age/Early Phase/5th Millennium BC, bilder av oldstidsgjenstander fra den aktuelle tidsepoke
