= Bodrogkeresztúr culture =

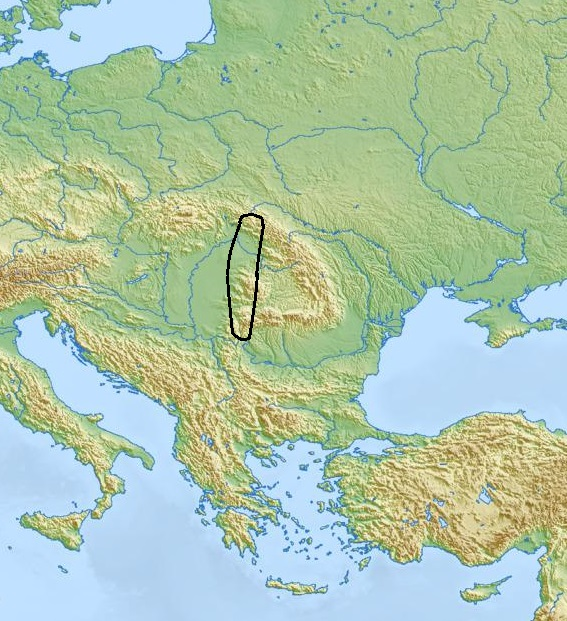
- Horizon: Old Europe
- Geographical range: Hungary, Romania
- Period: Eneolithic, Chalcolithic
- Dates: 4000-3600 BC
- Preceded by: Tiszapolgár culture
- Followed by: Baden culture, Coțofeni culture

The Bodrogkeresztúr culture was a middle Copper Age culture which flourished in the Carpathian Basin, in the territory of present-day Hungary and Romania from 4000 to 3600 BC.

The Bodrogkeresztúr culture is best known for its seventy cemeteries, which show strong genetic links with the preceding Tiszapolgár culture. Bodrogkeresztúr cemetieres make clear distinctions between males and females, who are buried on their right and left sides respectively. Both sexes are buried with their heads oriented towards the east. Burials contain pottery, stone and copper implements, and copper and gold ornaments.

The Bodrogkeresztúr appears to have practiced mixed agriculture and stockbreeding. Although primarily raising cattle, they appear to have raised sheep, goats and pigs as well. Wild fauna in their territories included aurochs, red deer, wild boar, roe deer and hare.

Bodrogkeresztúr ceramics are similar to those of the preceding Tiszapolgár culture, although a new form" referred to as the "milk jug" appears to have been introduced at this time. Flint and stone tools, copper and gold objects, ornaments and various implements are also inherited from the Tiszapolgár culture, although these objects appear at increasing frequency among the Bodrogkeresztúr culture.

The Bodrogkeresztúr people appear to have been living in communities composed of 15-20 closely related people. They appear to have been less patriarchal and more egalitarian than people of the preceding Tiszapolgár culture.

The physical type of the Bodrogkeresztúr people was of the Mediterranean type, and is contrasted with the "Proto-Europoid" type prevalent on the Eurasian Steppe.

In accordance with the Kurgan hypothesis, the Bodrogkeresztúr people are considered an "Indo-Europeanized" native culture whose structure was altered by invasions of Indo-European peoples from the east. Others have suggested that the Bodrogkeresztúr was natively Indo-European, and that it, along with the Sălcuţa culture of neighboring Bulgaria, migrated southwards and became the Proto-Greeks.

The population of Bodrogkeresztúr culture partially survived into the Bronze age, and indirectly to the Iron Age. By utilizing the anthropological Penrose method, Bodrogkeresztúr was shown, to have a significant connection with the Bronze age Maros-Perjamos culture, and indirectly through it to the Iron Age Celts of Transdanubia, and the Bosut culture of Vojvodina.

== Gallery ==
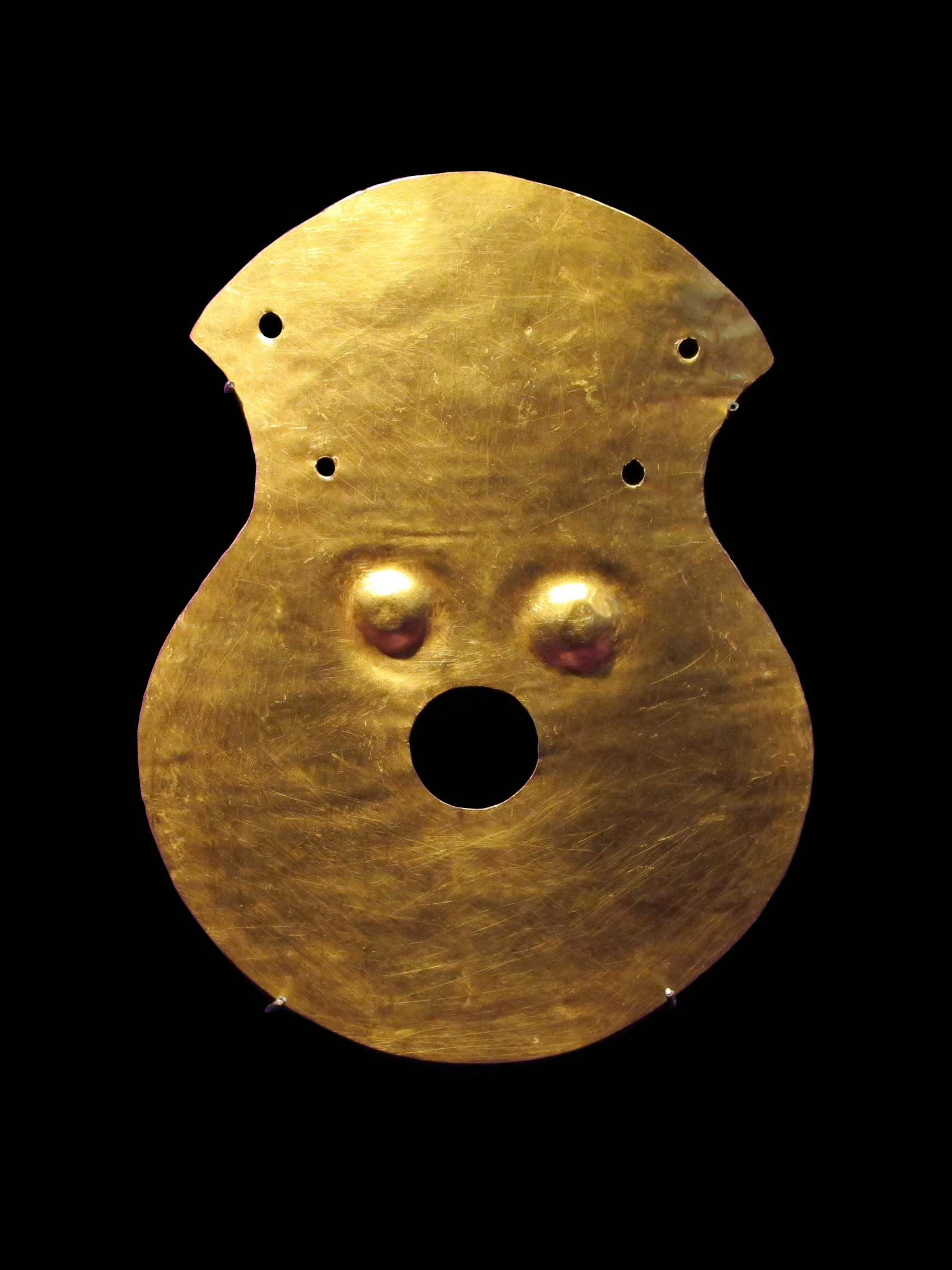
Moigrad treasure, 31.4cm x 24.1cm, 4000-3600 BC

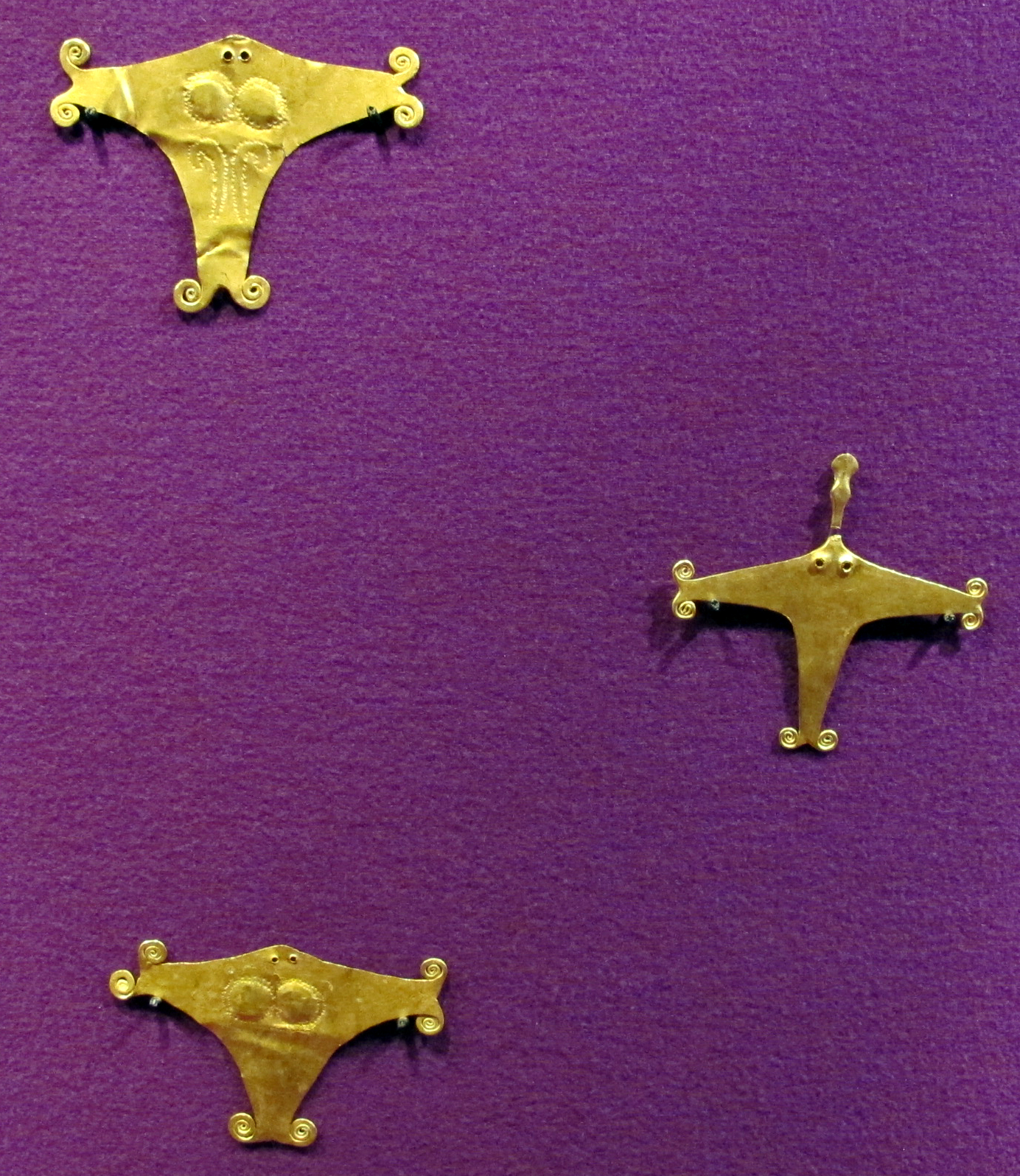
Moigrad treasure, 4000-3600 BC

== Bibliography ==
- Mallory, J. P.; Adams, Douglas Q. (1997). "Bodrogkeresztúr culture". Encyclopedia of Indo-European Culture. Taylor & Francis. pp. 75–76. ISBN 1884964982.
- Patay, Pal (1974). "Die hochkupferzeitliche Bodrogkeresztúr-Kultur" [The High Copper Age Bodrogkeresztúr culture]. Bericht der Römisch-Germanischen Kommission 55, 1, 1974, pp. 1-71 (in German).
