= Tisza culture =

Neolithic European archaeological culture

- Horizon: Old Europe
- Geographical range: Central Europe, Pannonian Plain
- Period: Neolithic, Chalcolithic
- Dates: c. 5400 BC – 4500 BC
- Preceded by: Linear Pottery culture, Starčevo culture
- Followed by: Tiszapolgár culture, Lengyel culture

The Tisza culture is a Neolithic archaeological culture of the Alföld plain in modern-day Hungary, Western Romania, Eastern Slovakia, and Ukrainian Zakarpattia Oblast in Central Europe. The culture is dated to between 5400 BCE and 4500/4400 BCE.

== Settlement and chronology ==
The Tisza culture emerged on the Alföld plain around 5400 BCE and endured until about 4500/4400 BCE. Its hallmark settlement type was the tell, a permanent mound formed by centuries of occupation; at Hódmezővásárhely–Gorzsa alone, tells measuring some 3–3.5 ha rose up to 3 m above the floodplain, housing early Tisza (Tisza I) through Late Tisza phases (Tisza IV). A suite of conventional and Accelerator mass spectrometry (AMS) radiocarbon dates places Gorzsa's Late Neolithic sequence between 4846 and 4495 cal BC, confirming sustained habitation and complex social organisation that contrasts with shorter‑lived flat settlements elsewhere.

== Technology and exchange ==
Tisza material culture is defined by a rich lithic repertoire combining a dominant chipped assemblage—short end scrapers on flakes and simple blades for harvesting (sickle inserts) and woodworking—with a wide variety of polished and ground implements such as axes, adzes, chisels, millstones and burnishers. Chipped tools were predominantly struck from Transdanubian radiolarites (Bakony, Mecsek), Central Banat radiolarian chert and Tevel flint, while later Classical and Late Tisza layers introduce imported obsidian (Tokaj–Prešov source) and Volhynian/Prut flint. Polished axes and adzes further attest to long‑distance procurement of hornfels (South Carpathians), greenschists (Bohemian Massif), amphibolites, dolerites and metasandstones, many of which were transported as cobble or rough‑outs via major river corridors. The Maros, Tisza and Temes/Timiș rivers clearly functioned as north–south and east–west axes for raw‑material exchange and cultural contact across the Carpathian Basin, embedding the Tisza culture in a broad network of Neolithic interaction.

== Genetics ==
Lipson and colleagues (2017) analyzed the remains of five individuals ascribed to the Tisza culture. The three males were G-P15, I-P37 and I-P215. mtDNA extracted were various subclades of U, H, T, and K.

== Artefacts ==
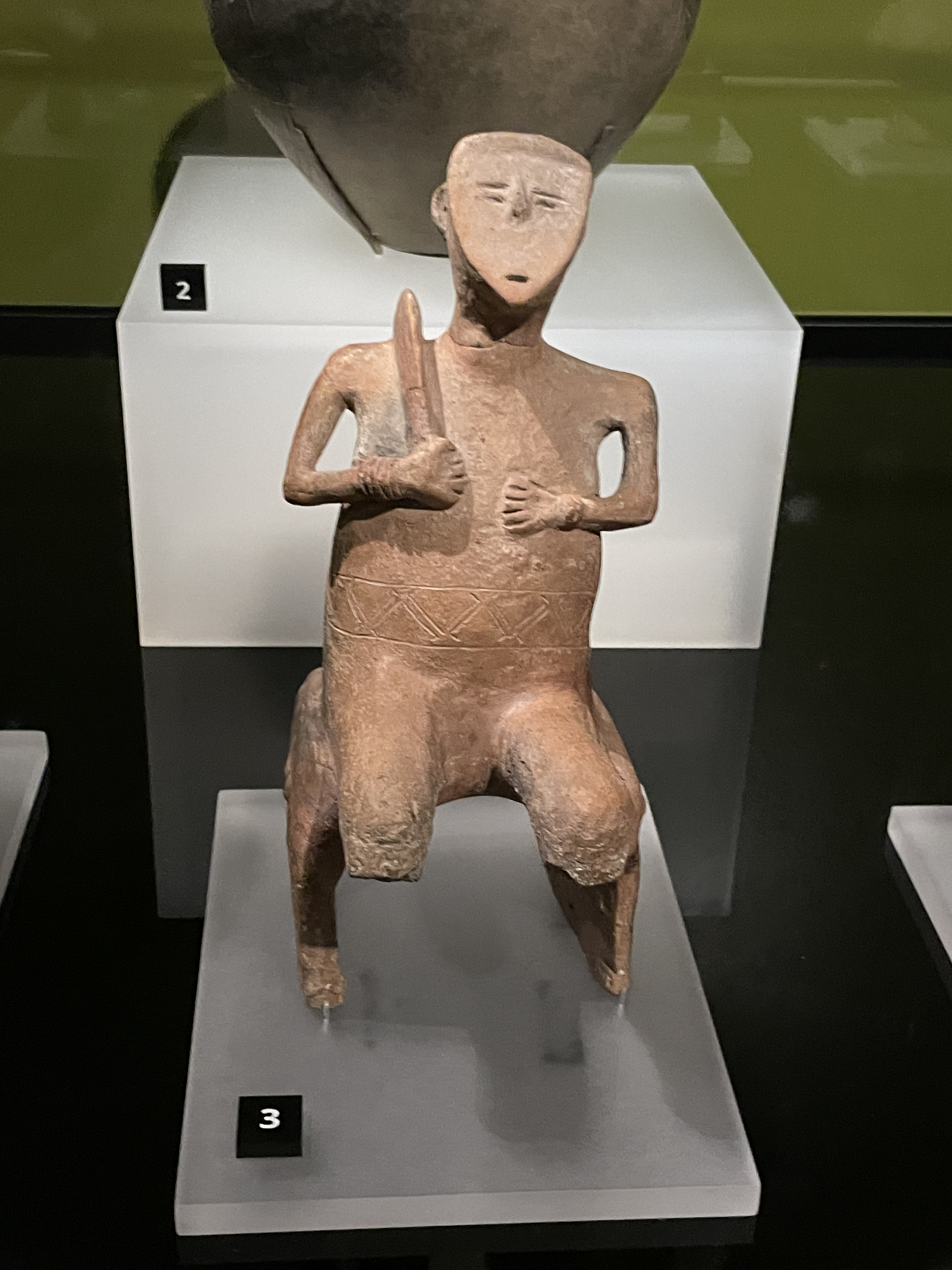
Ceramic figurine

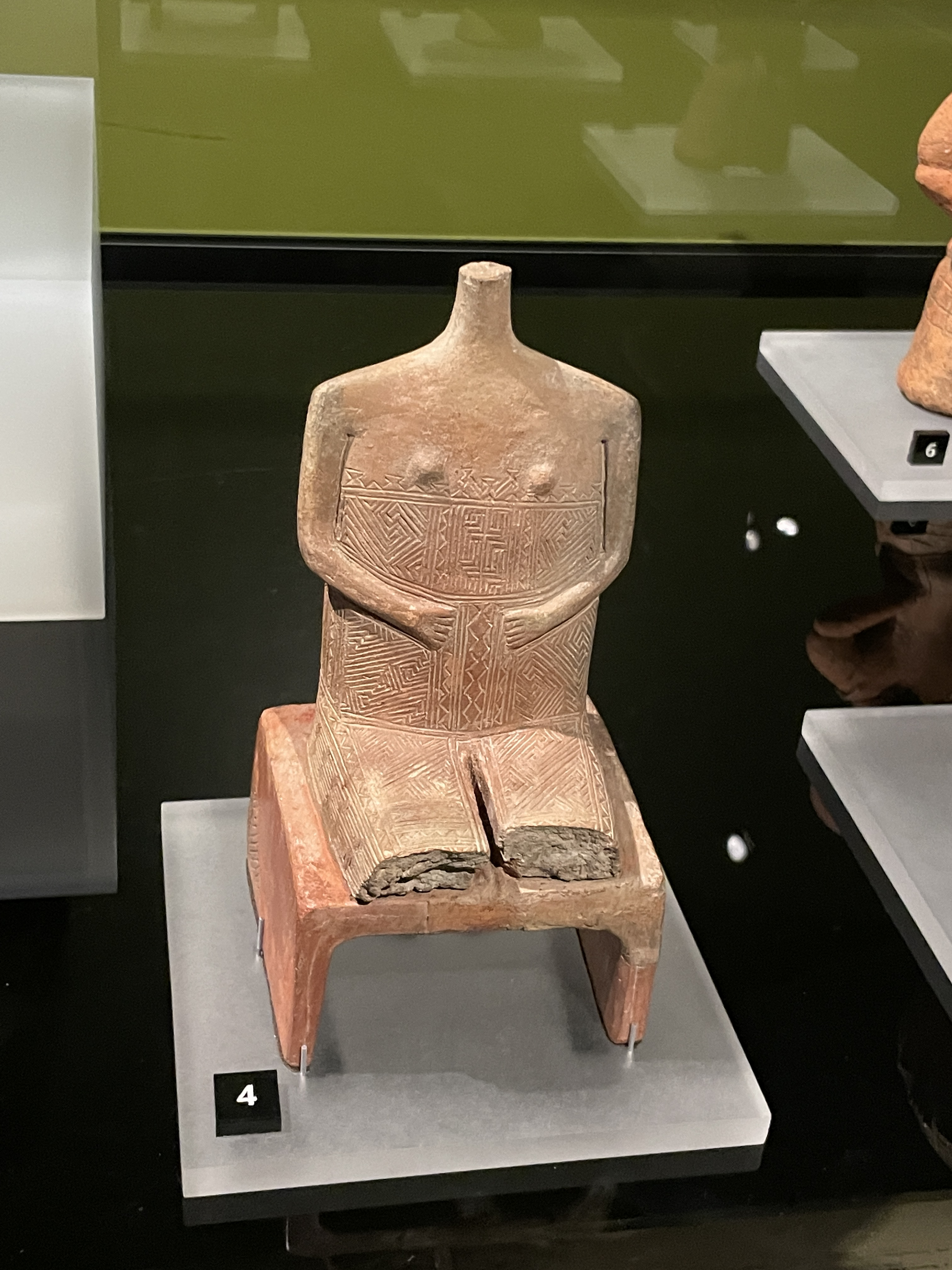
Ceramic figurine

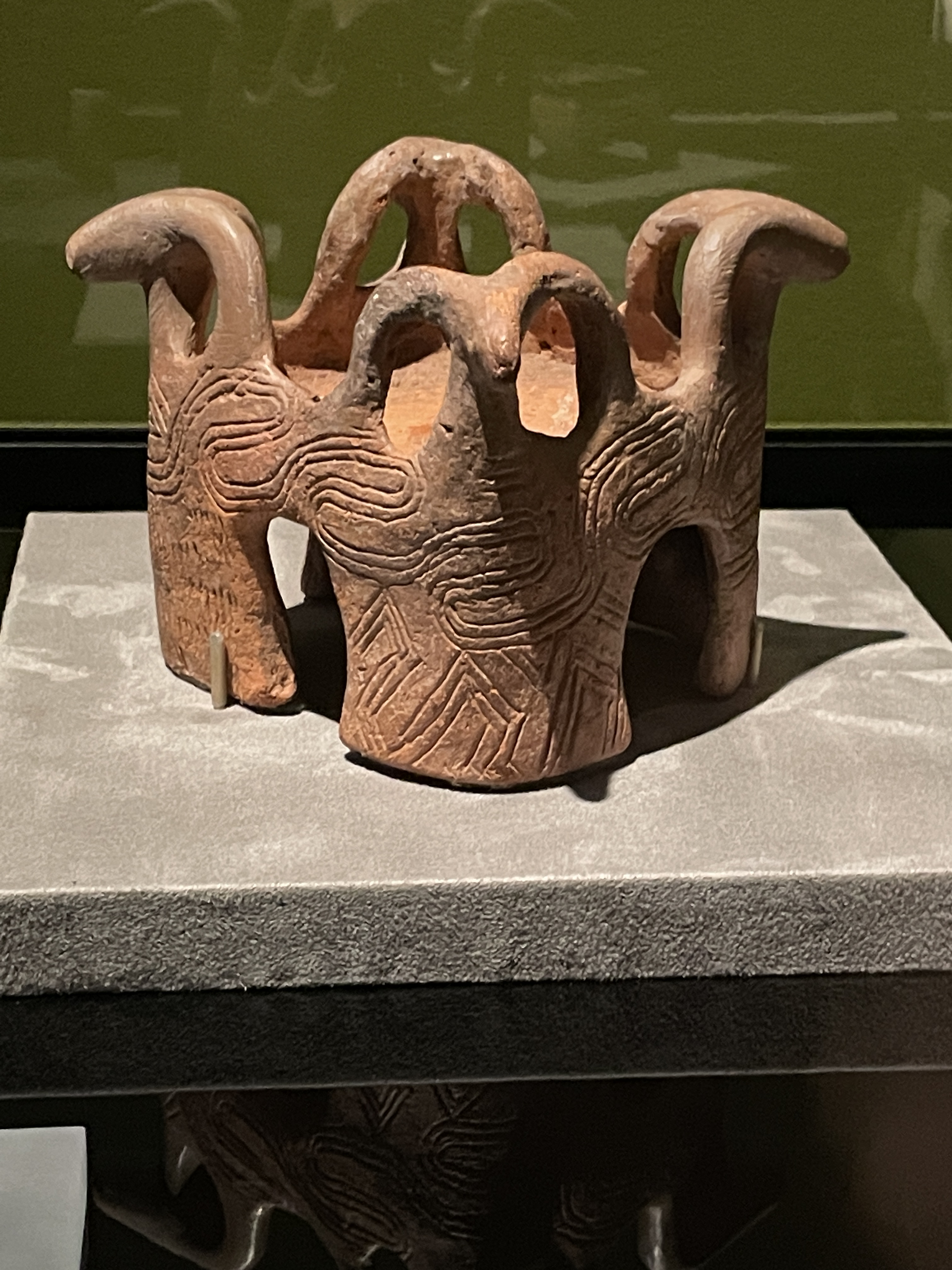
Ceramic altar, 5300-5200 BC.

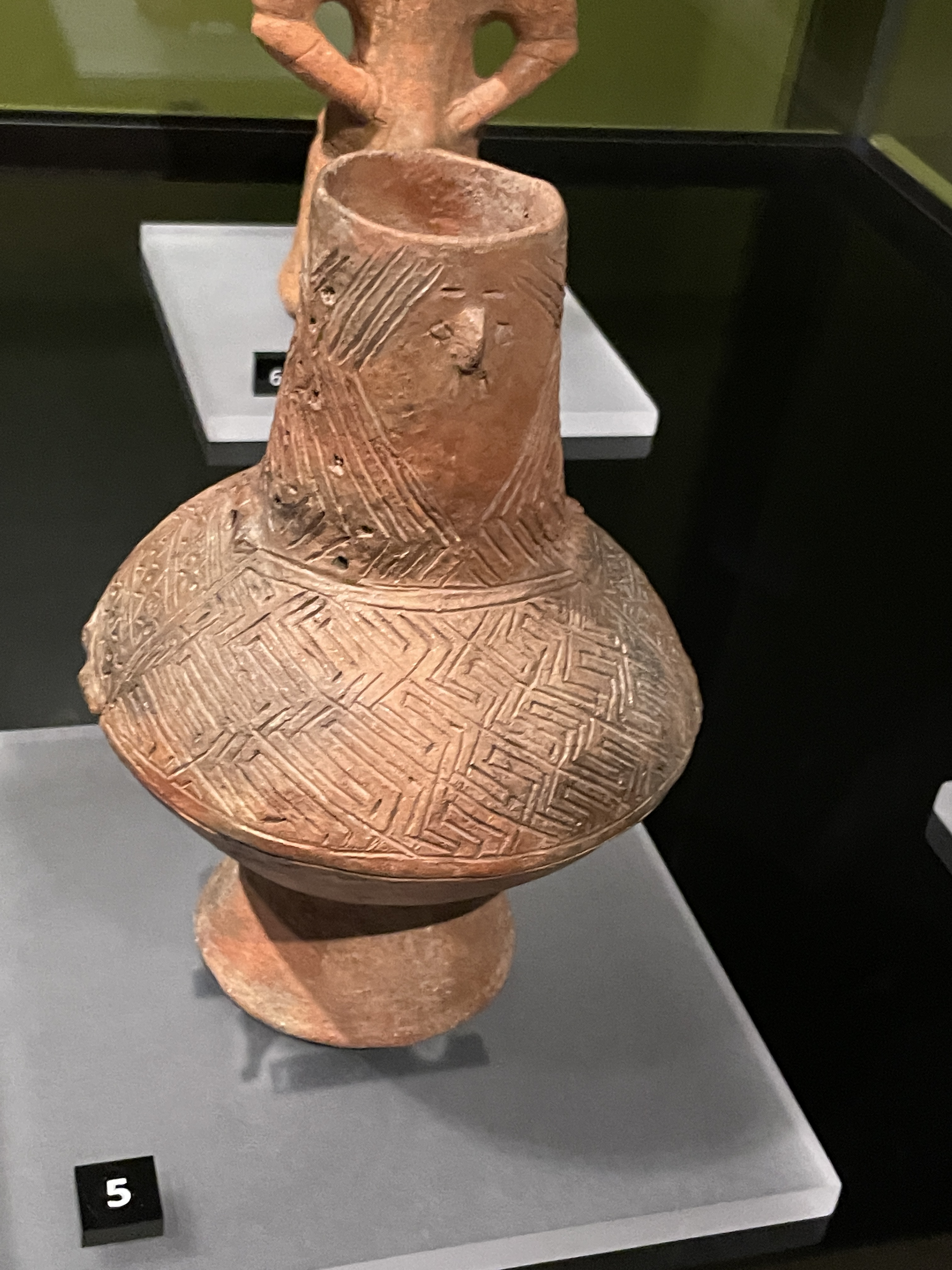
Ceramic vessel

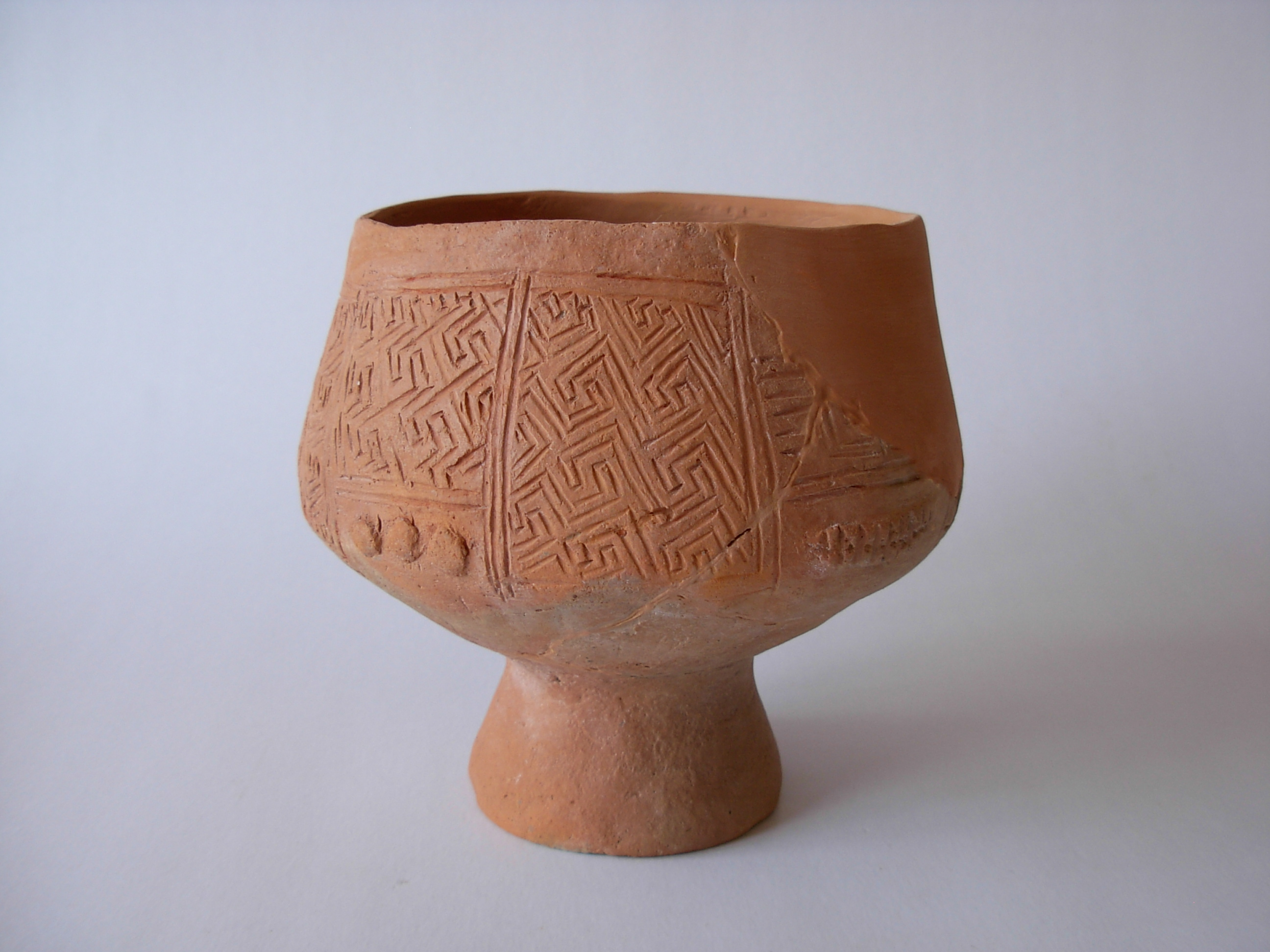
Tisza pottery

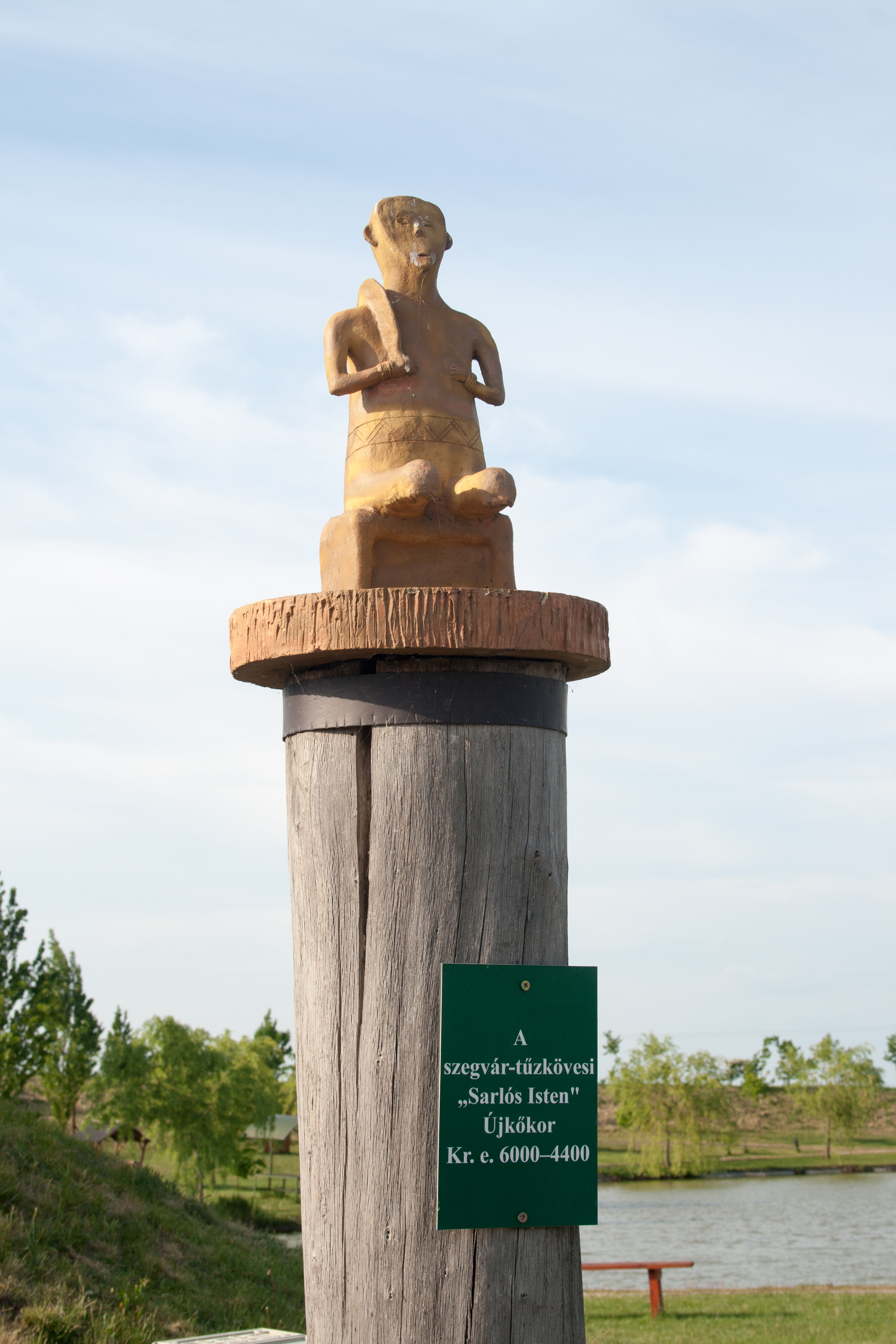
Modern sculpture depicting the Szegvár-Tűzkövesi idol

== House reconstruction ==
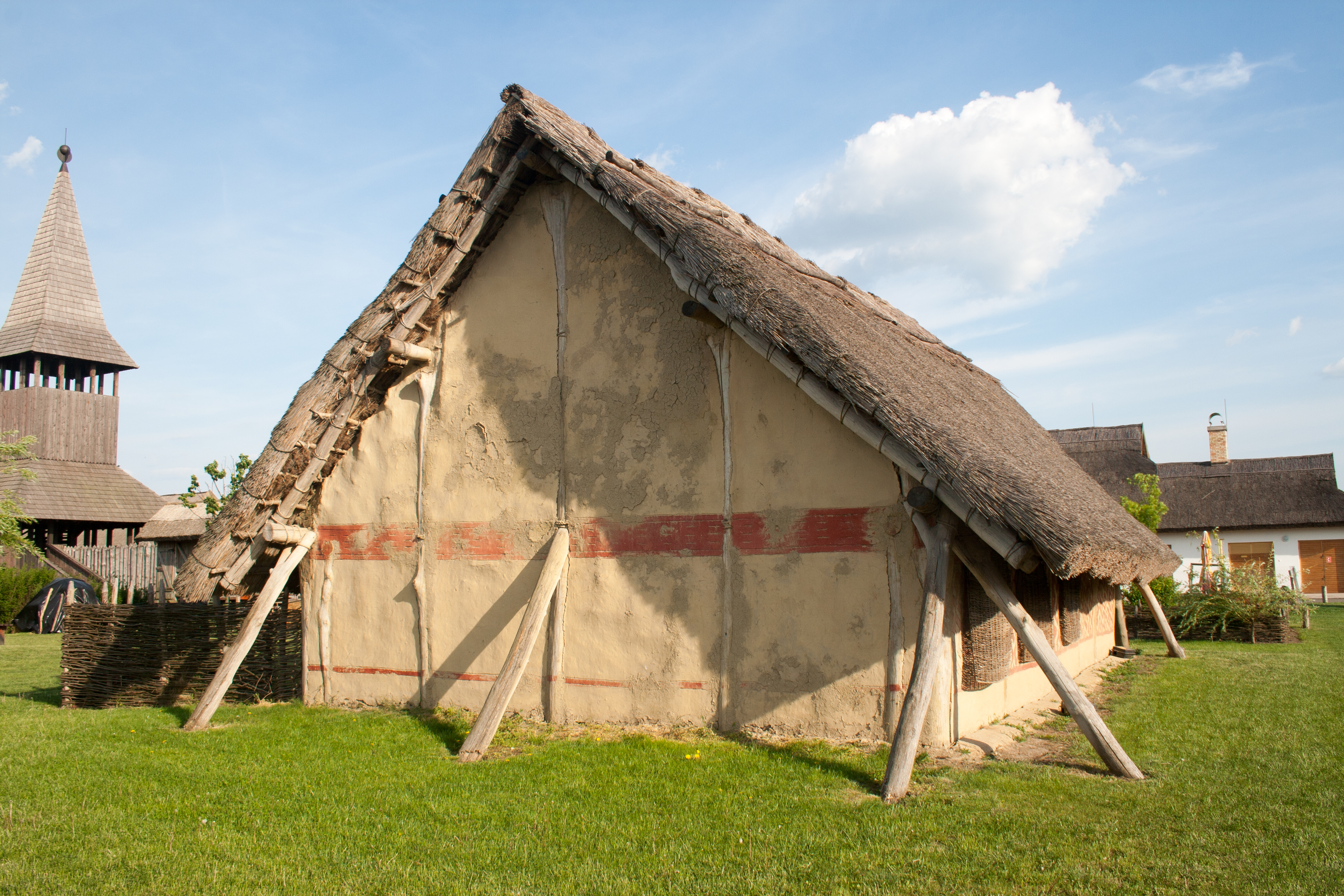
Tisza house reconstruction at Polgár-Csőszhalom, Hungary.

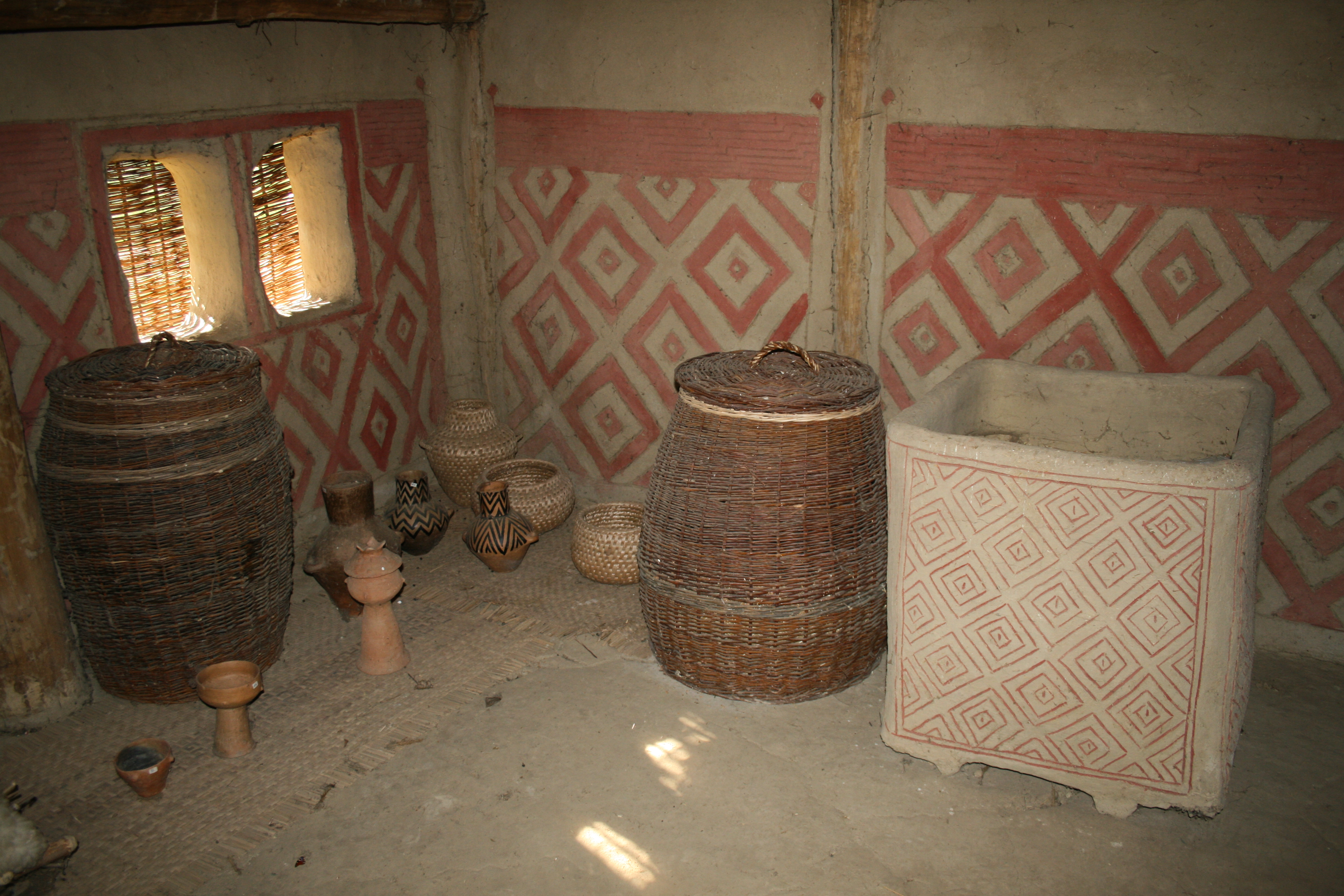
House interior, reconstruction

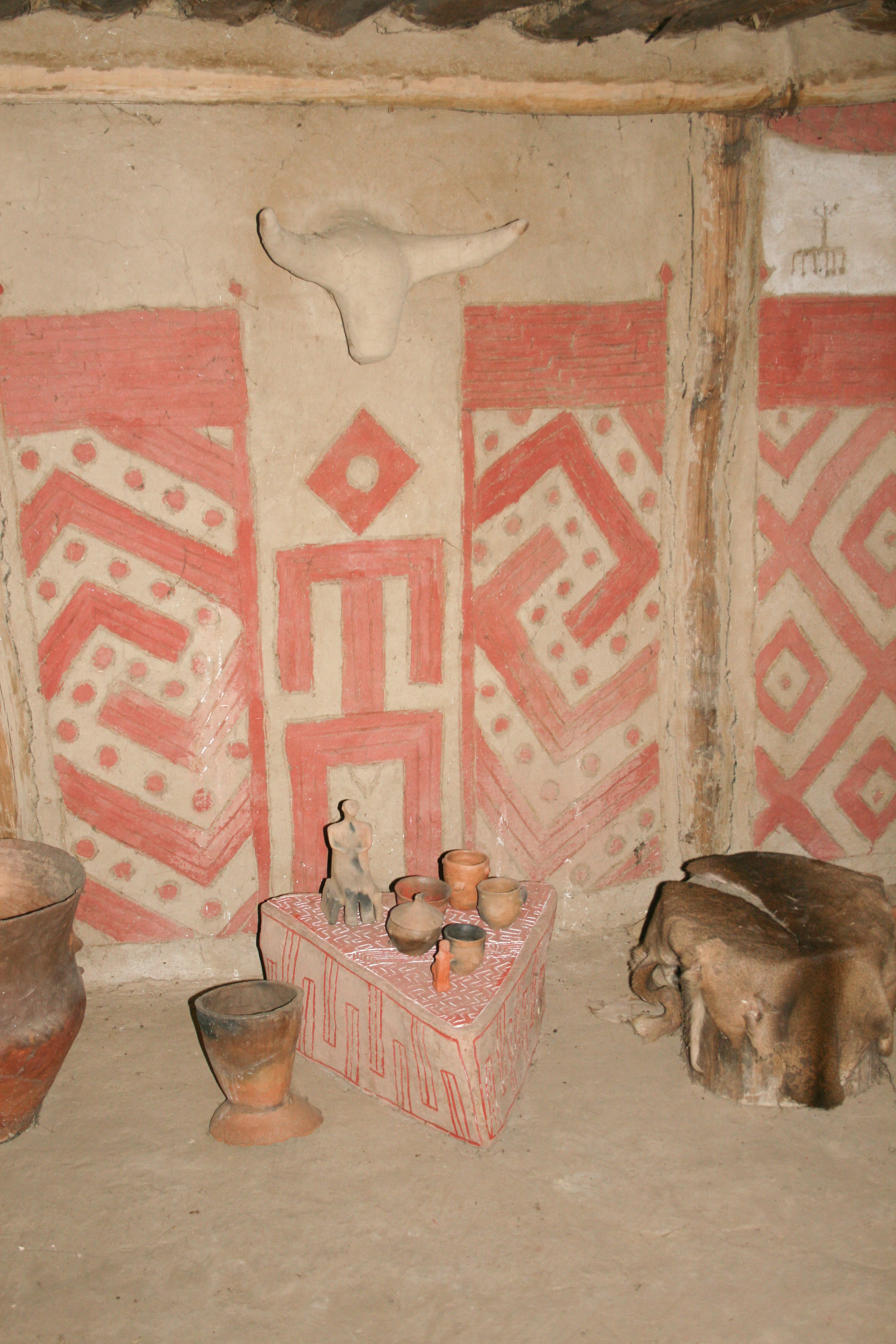
House interior, reconstruction

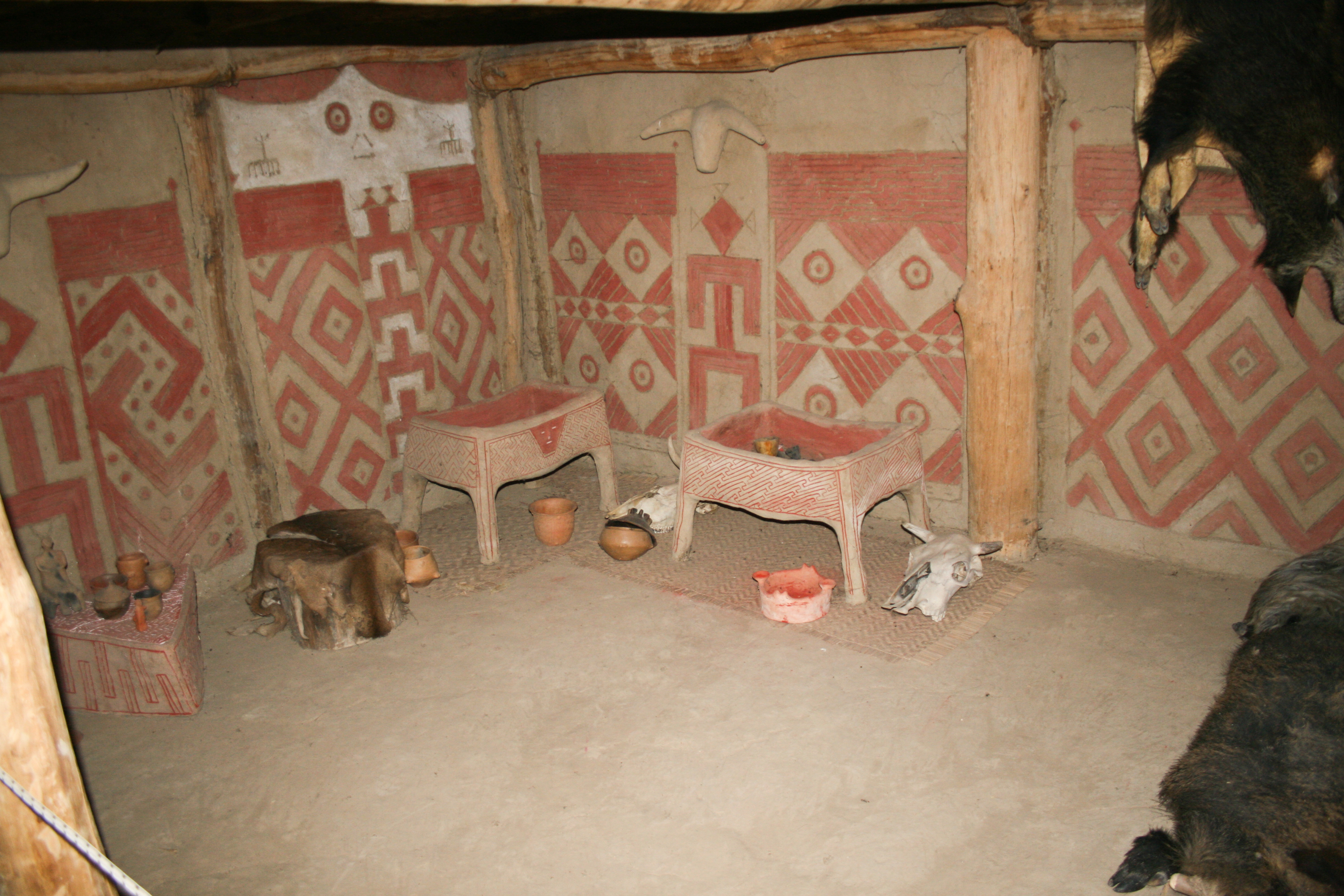
House interior, reconstruction

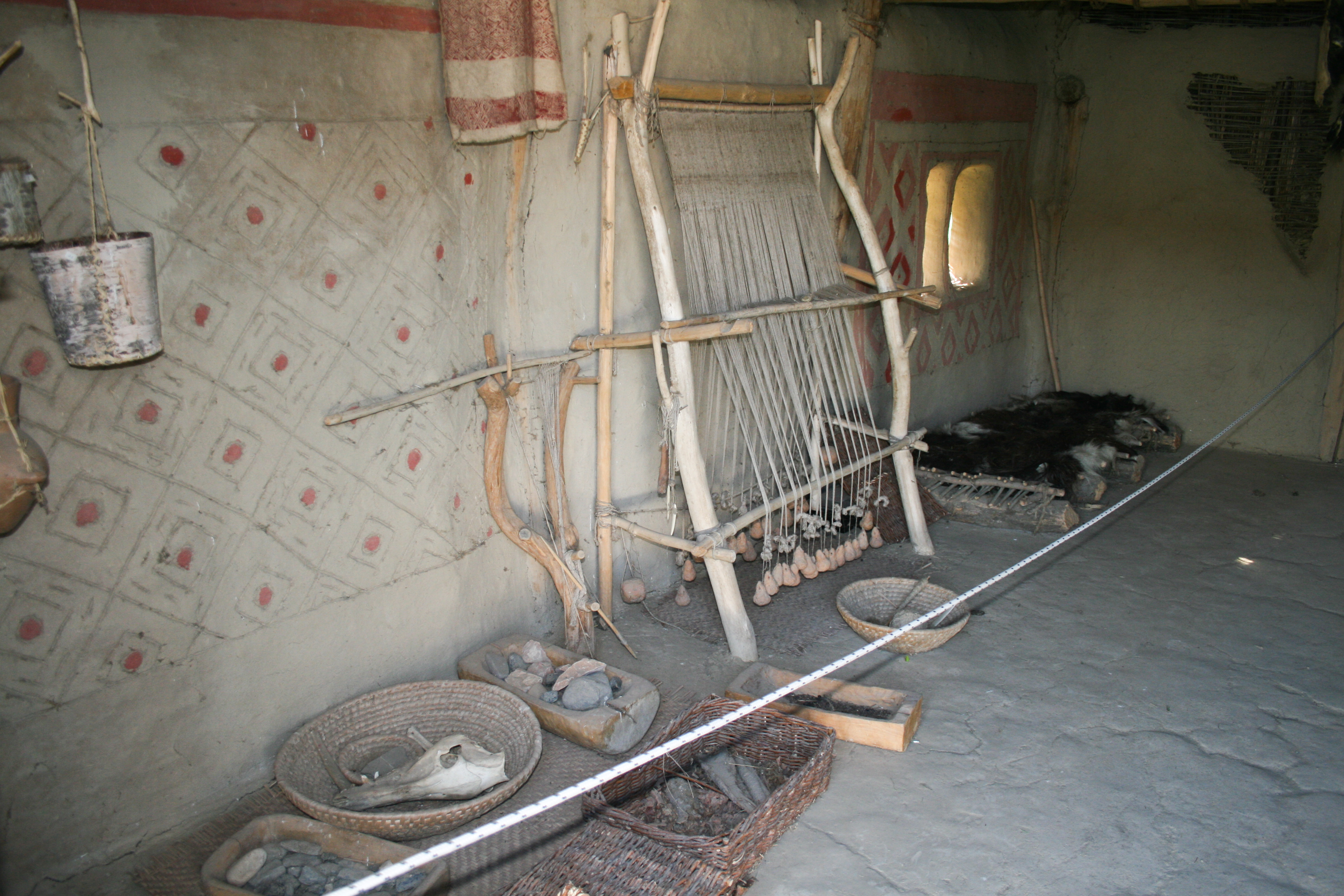
House interior, reconstruction

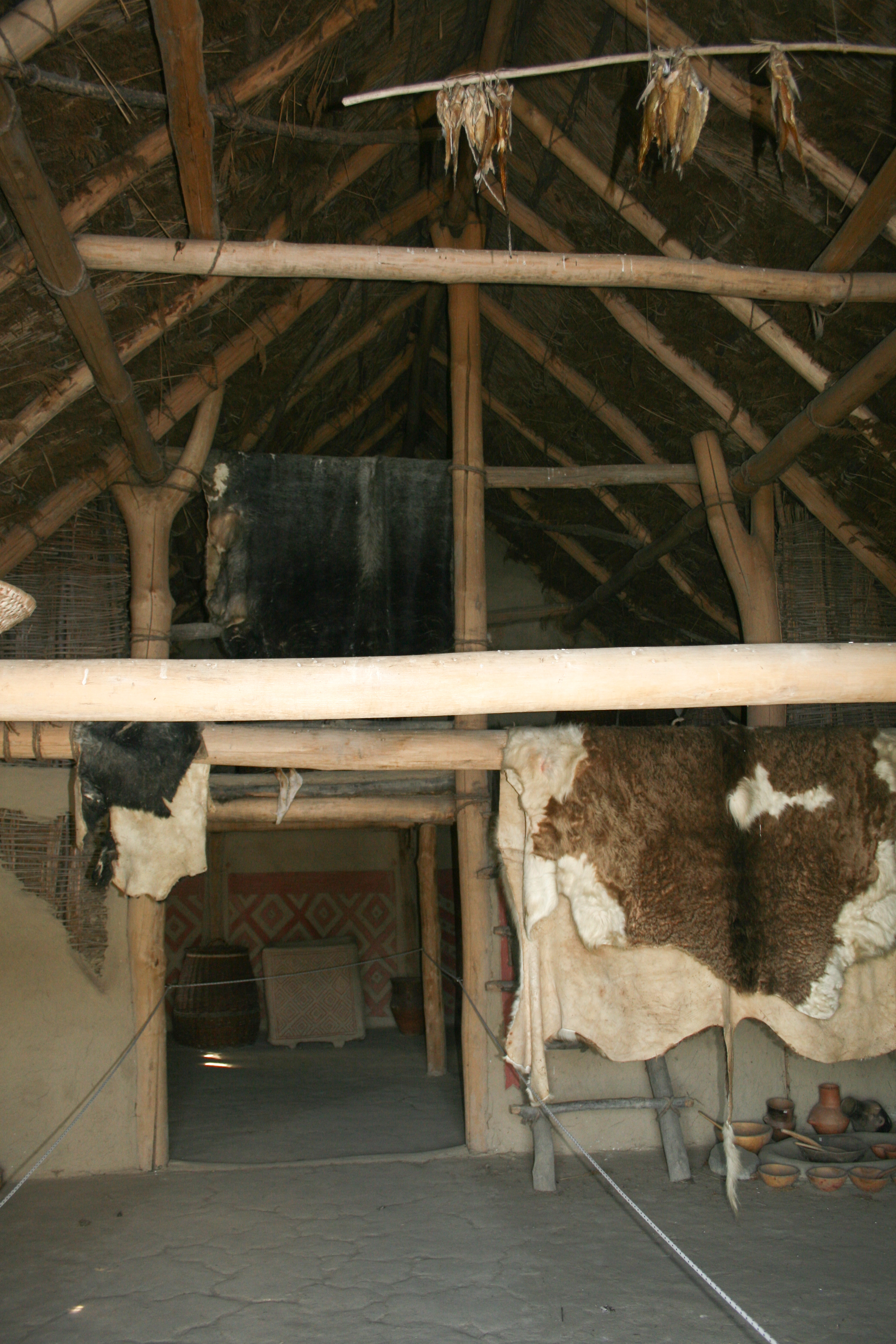
House interior, reconstruction

== See also ==
- The Szegvár-tűzkövesi idol
- Prehistoric Europe
- Old Europe (archaeology)
