= List of ancient towns in Scythia Minor =

This is a list of towns in Scythia Minor that were mentioned in ancient writings.

| Name | Location | Reference | Etymology |
|---|---|---|---|
| Ad Salices | near the mouths of the Danube | | |
| Ad Stoma | probably Sf. Gheorghe | | στομα-stóma=mouth, from Greek |
| Adina | | | Greek |
| Aegyssus | today Tulcea | | Greek Αιγισος (Egisòs) |
| Aliobrix | today Orlivka | | |
| Altina | today Oltina | | Dacian |
| Apollonia | today in Sozopol, Bulgaria | | Greek |
| Argamum | today Dolojman | | Celtic |
| Arrubium | today Măcin | | Celtic |
| Axiopolis | today Cernavodă | | Axio- from Thracian, Polis from Greek |
| Beroe | today Ostrov | | Latin |
| Buteridava | Northern Dobrogea | | Dacian |
| Kaliakra | | | ancient Akrai (Acrae) |
| Callatis | today Mangalia | | Greek |
| Capidava | today Capidava (Topalu) | | Dacian |
| Carsium | today Hârşova | | Greek |
| Cius | today Gârliciu | | |
| Civitas Tropaensium | today Adamclisi | | Latin |
| Dinogetia | today Garvăn | | Dacian |
| Dionysopolis | today Balchik, Bulgaria | | Greek |
| Durostorum | today Silistra, Bulgaria | | Celtic |
| Genucla | on the Danube; unknown location | | Dacian |
| Halmyris | today Murighiol | | Greek |
| Heracleea | today Enisala | | Greek |
| Histria | today Istria | | Greek |
| Ibida or Libida | today Slava Rusă | | |
| Mesembria | today Nessabar, Bulgaria | | Thracian |
| Noviodunum | today Isaccea | | Celtic |
| Odessos | today Varna, Bulgaria | | Greek |
| Sagadava | on the Danube; now in Bulgaria | | Dacian |
| Salsovia | today Mahmudia | | |
| Stratonis | today Tuzla | | Greek |
| Sacidava | today Izvoare | | Dacian |
| Talamonium | today Nufăru | | Latin |
| Tomis | today Constanţa | Κωνσταντια-Kostantìa | Greek |
| Troesmis | today Igliţa-Turcoaia | | Dacian |
| Ulmetum | today Pantelimon | | Latin |
| Zaldapa | today in Bulgaria | | Dacian |

== See also ==
- List of ancient Thracian cities
- List of Dacian cities
- Peuce Island
- STRATEG. Defensive strategies and cross border policies. Integration of the Lower Danube area in the Roman civilization
