= Capidava (disambiguation) =

Capidava is an ancient Daco-Roman fortified city in modern-day Romania. It can also refer to:

- Capidava, Constanţa, a village with the same name and in the same place with the ancient city, part of the Topalu commune, Constanţa County, Romania
- Capidava (spider), a genus of spiders
