= Libida =

Coordinates: 44.8544°N 28.5905°E

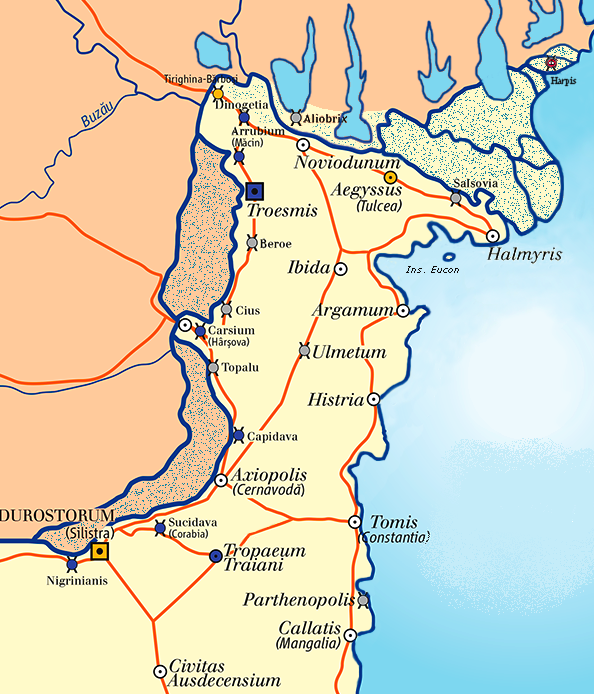
Eastern Moesia and Limes Moesiae

Plan of Ibida by Ștefan

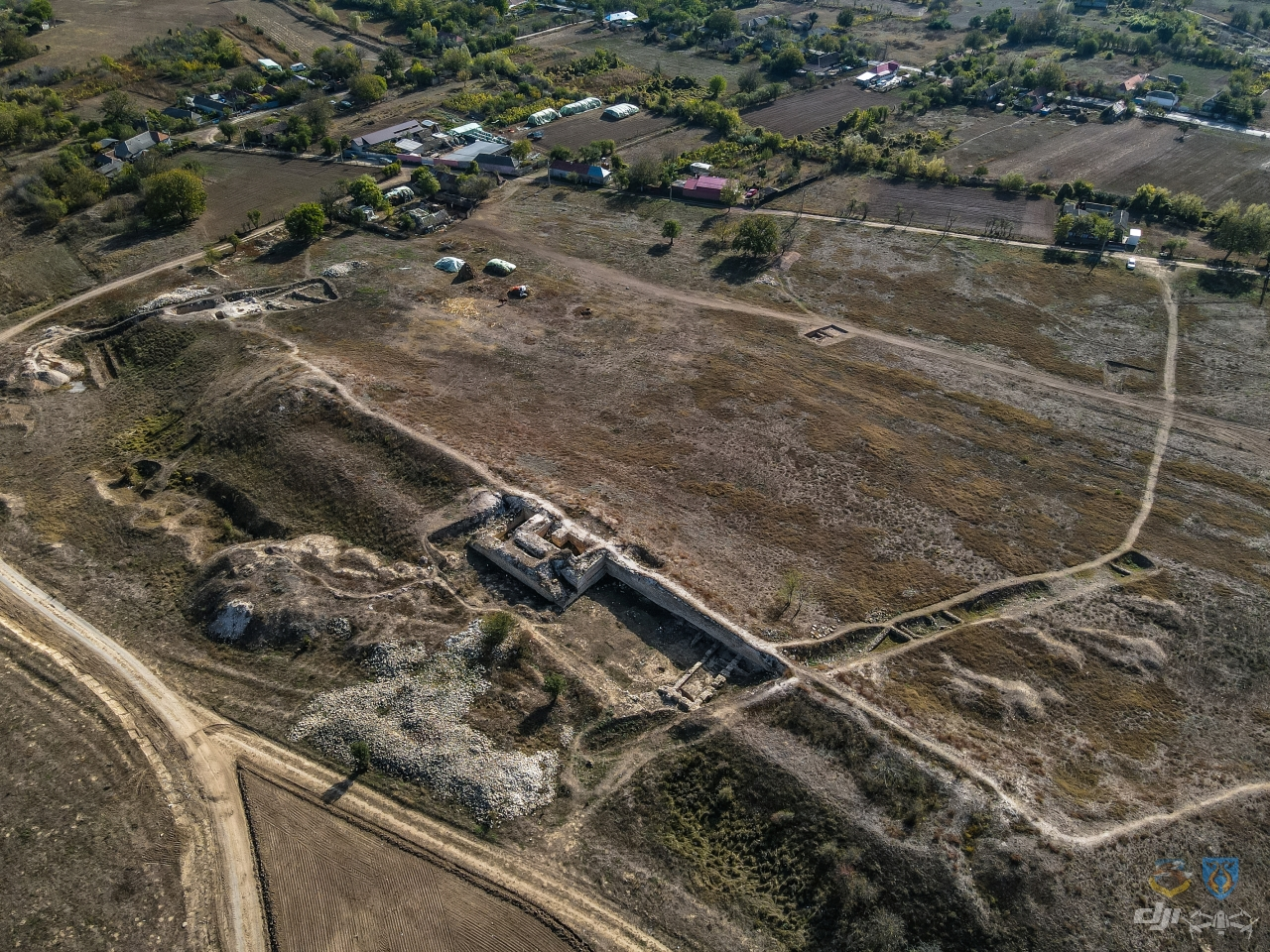
The northern walls of Ibida

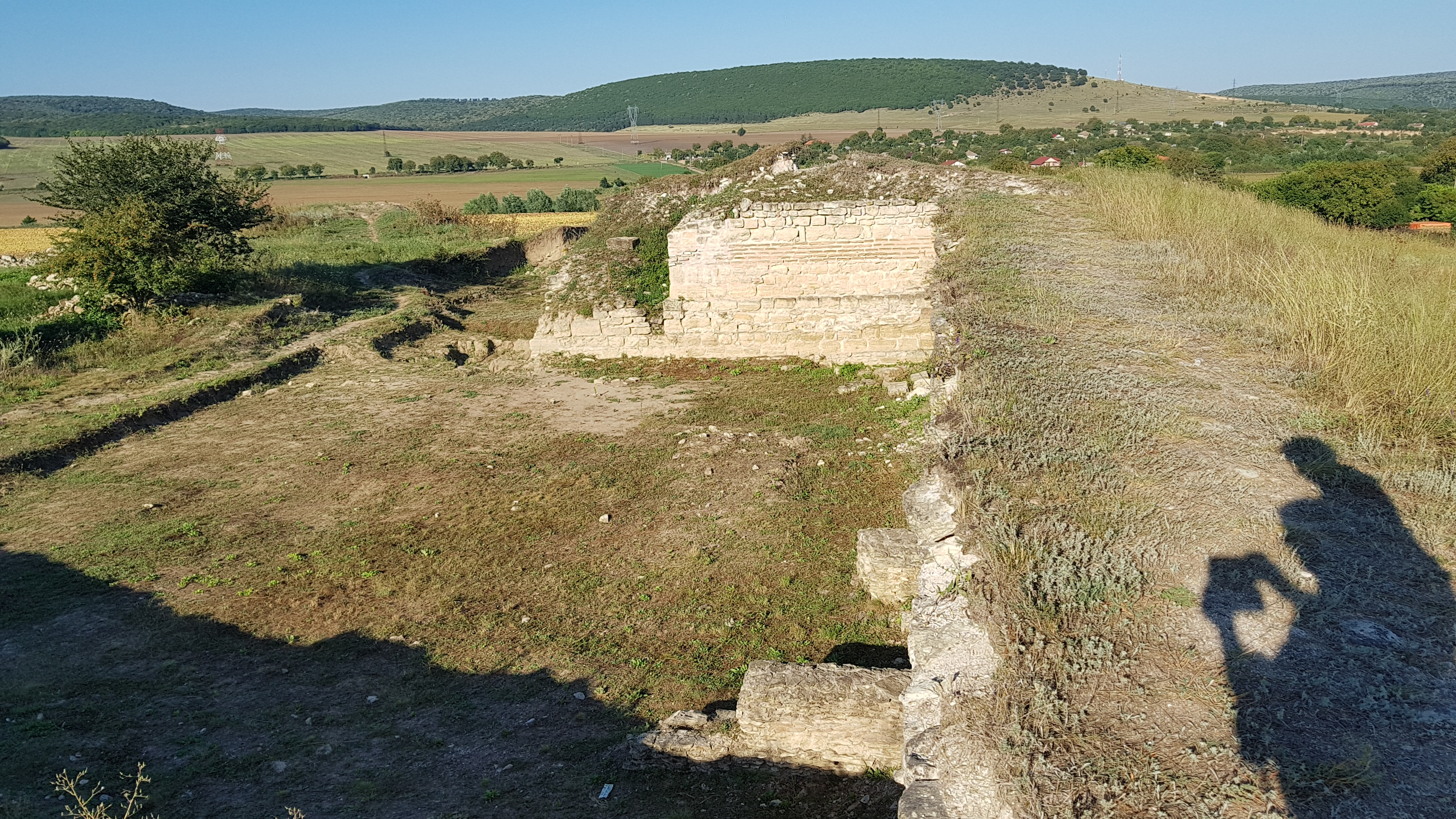
Northern walls

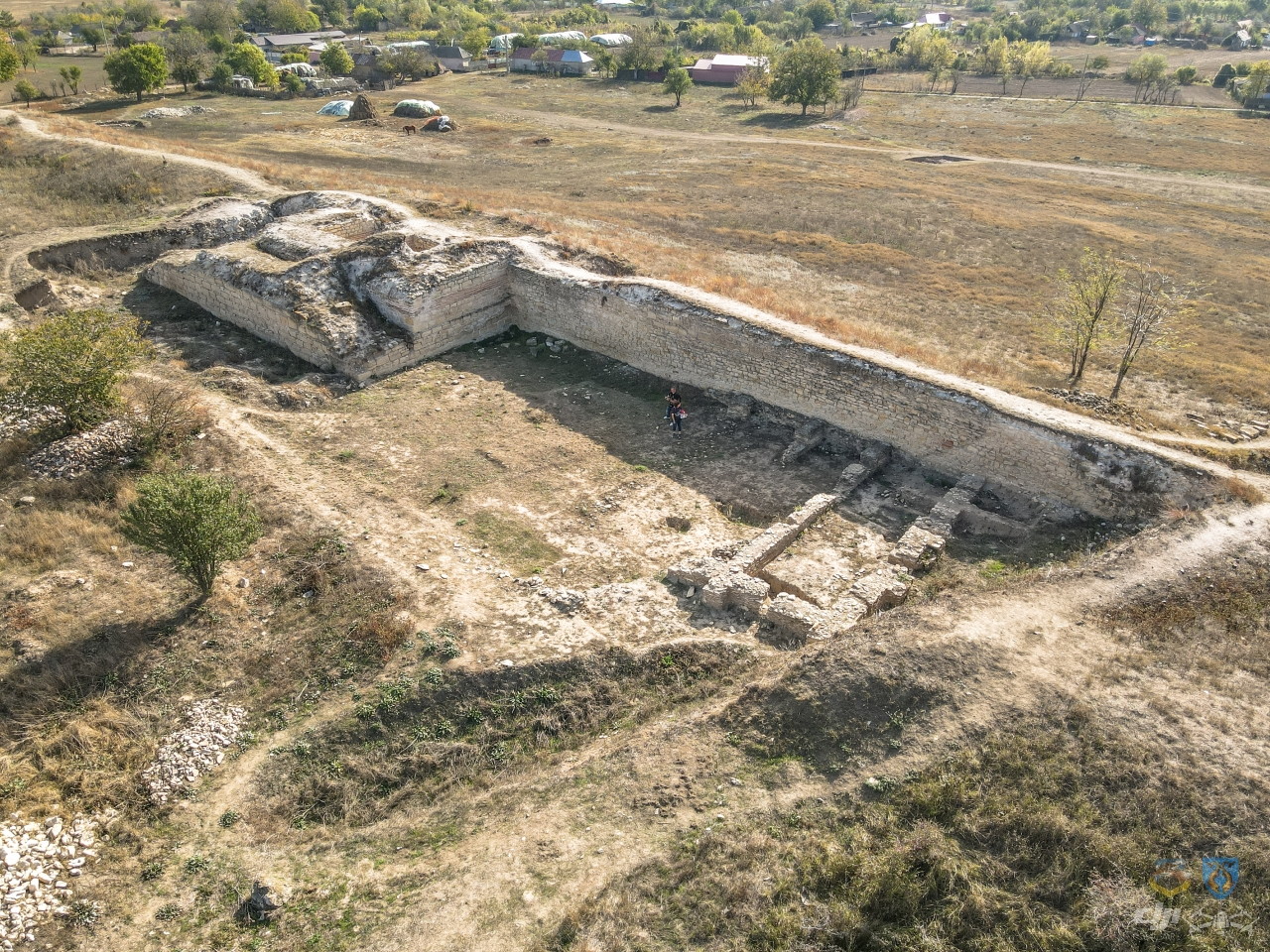
4th c. walls built over 2nd c. buildings

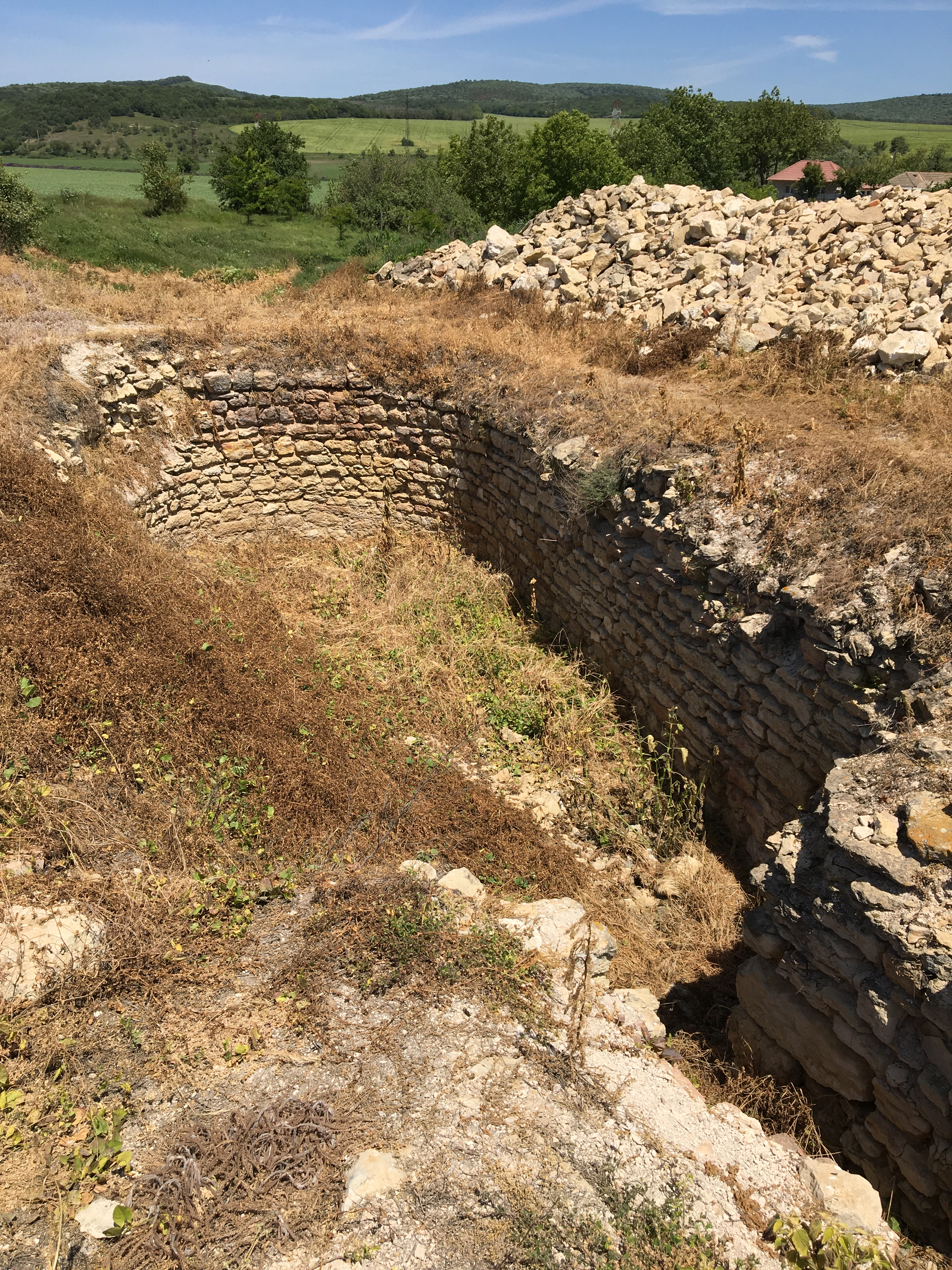
Horseshoe-shaped tower

Libida or Ibida was an ancient city in Roman Moesia, later Roman Scythia Minor, today's Dobruja region of modern Romania. It is in the village of Slava Rusă.

== History ==
A Getic settlement existed here in the 4th century BC.

The Romans conquered the area in 27 BC; it became the Roman province of Moesia in around 6 AD and the first city walls were built under the Principate.

In Roman times its growing importance as a centre of commerce led to the construction of grandiose city walls during the reign of the Tetrarchy with modifications under Constantine the Great. The city walls encompassed approx. 24 ha with an attached fort of approx. 3.5 ha on Harada hill. It suffered attacks by the Goths (4th century under Valens), by the Kutrigurs in 559 under Justinian I who made the most extensive reconstruction, and the Avars-Slavs (6th century).

The town and area around was abandoned in the 7th c. AD after the Bulgar invasions.

== The site ==
The city lay on the flat land while attached to it on the hill to the southwest was a fort. The northern part of the city walls has been excavated.

A Christian basilica in the city has been excavated.

A paleo-Christian monastic complex from the Byzantine period lies about 2.5 km to the west of the city.

The Roman necropolis of the 4th to 6th centuries AD covers several hectares up to 2.5 km from the city walls.

== Archaeological history ==
The town was described by Pamfil Polonic in 1897, who identified 33 towers and 3 gates. Vasile Pârvan identified the settlement in 1911 as Ibida. Constantin Moisil named the town in 1916 when a treasure of drachmes was found. In 1917 the Bulgar lieutenant Iconomof performed excavations and found the remains of a Basilica with 3 naves. Research in 1953 led to the discovery of Getic and Roman-Byzantine bricks and pottery and bronze coins from the Justinian I era.

== Bibliography ==
- A. Aricescu, “Despre numele aşezării antice de la Slava RuSt,” Buletinul Monumentelor Istorice 40.3, (1971) 58-60.
- Pârvan, V. 1912, Ulmetum I. Descoperirile primei campanii de săpături din vara anului 1911, AARMSI 2, 34, p. 497–607.
- Pârvan, V. 1923, Începuturile vieţii romane la Gurile Dunării, București.
- Barnea, I. 1968, Perioada Dominatului (sec. IV – VII), în Vulpe, R., Barnea, I., Din istoria Dobrogei. II. Romanii la Dunărea de Jos, București.
- Suceveanu, Al., Barnea, Al. 1991, La Dobroudja Roumaine – București.

== See also ==
- Histria
- List of ancient towns in Scythia Minor
