= Istropolis =

Istropolis may refer to:

- Bratislava, capital of Slovakia
- Histria (ancient city), ancient city of Lower Moesia, now in Romania
