= Stoma (disambiguation) =

A stoma is a pore, found in the epidermis of leaves, stems, and other organs, that facilitates gas exchange.

Stoma may also refer to:

- Stoma (medicine), an opening which connects a portion of the body cavity to the outside environment
- "Stoma", single by Welcome (band)
- "Stoma", track on 2010 album The Age of Hell by Chimaira
- "Stoma", track on 2015 soundtrack album Rosetta: Audio/Visual Original Score
- Saulius Stoma, a Lithuanian politician
- Sternberg Test of Mental Ability (STOMA), an intelligence test by Robert Sternberg

== See also ==
- Ad Stoma, a fort in the Roman province of Moesia
