= Halmyris =

- Salmorus, Thalamonium
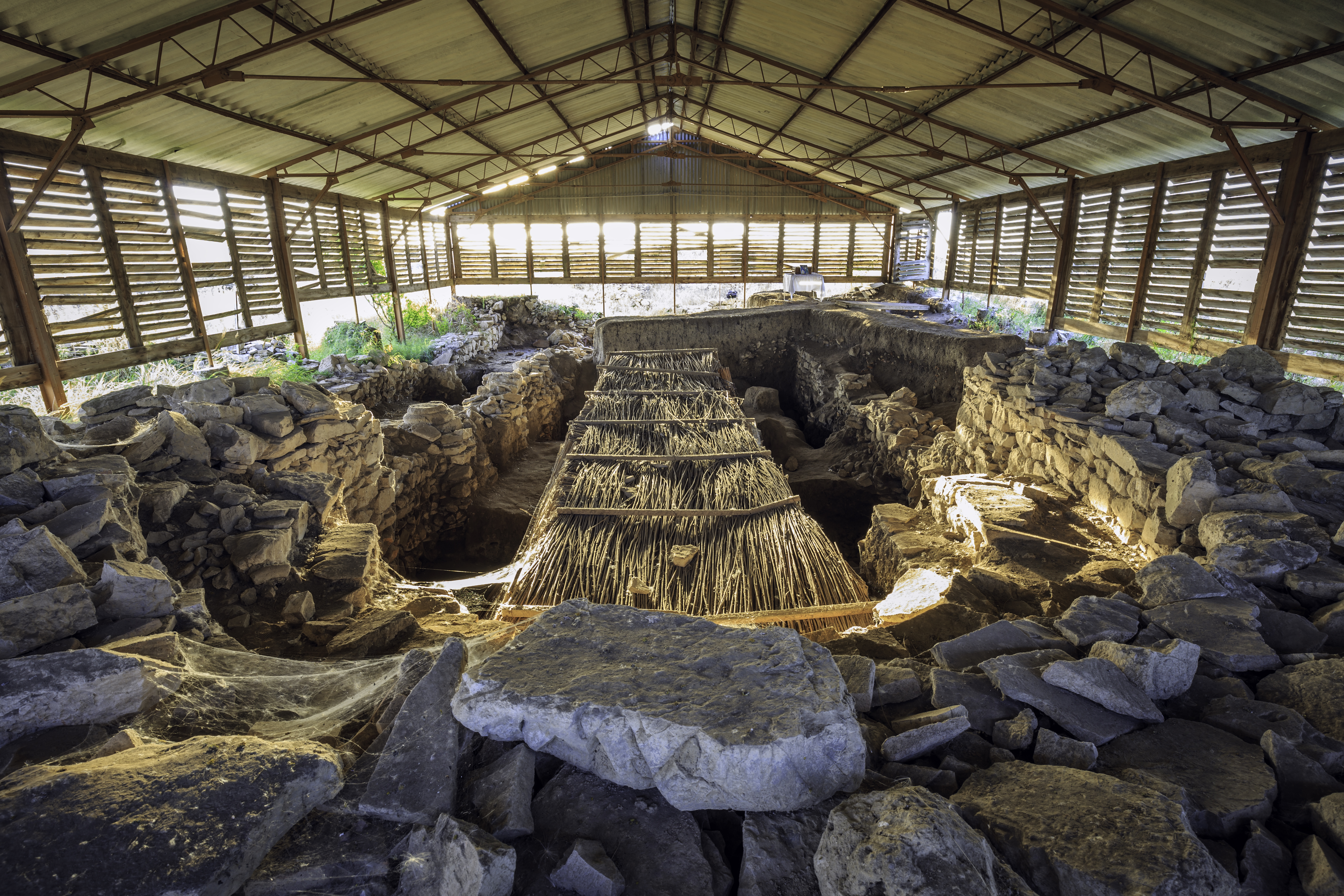

- Location within Romania
- 45.0249°N 29.1977°E
- Location: Murighiol, Romania

History
- Founded: 2nd century AD
- Built: Trajan
- Abandoned: 7th century AD

Site notes
- Elevation: 26 m (85 ft)
- Archaeologists: Dr. Mihail Zahariade, Dr. John Karavas
- Condition: Ruined

Halmyris (Ancient Greek: Ἁλμυρίς) was a Roman and Byzantine fort, settlement and naval port, located 2.5 km east of the village of Murighiol at the mouth of the Danube Delta in Romania. Its name in Roman times was probably Almyridensium.

Halmyris occupied a key location in antiquity at the end of the Roman Moesian Limes frontier defensive system and is included in no less than eight important Greek and Latin sources, including the Itinerarium Antonini and Notitia Dignitatum.

Halmyris served as a depot for supplies, colonisation and cultural exchange in the region for 1,100 years from the Iron Age to the Byzantine period.

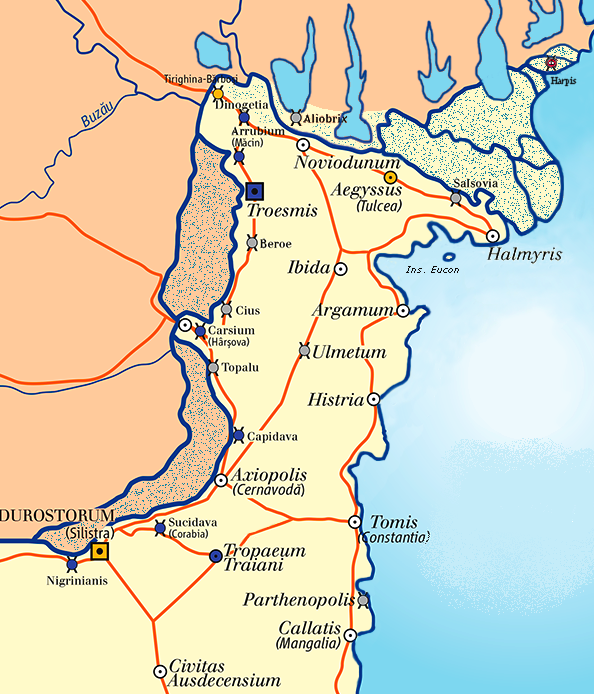
Eastern Moesia and Limes Moesiae, and Ancient towns and colonies in modern Dobruja (ancient coastline)

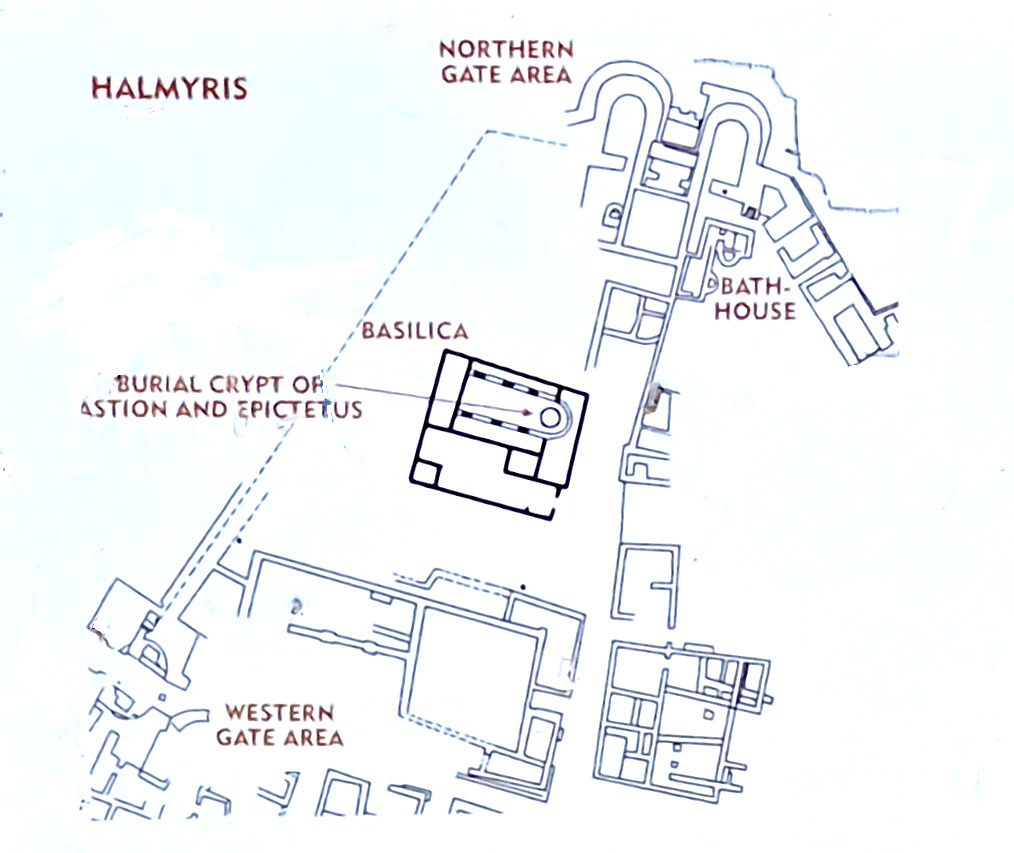
Plan Halmyris

== Location ==
Halmyris was built strategically on a rocky peninsula on the bank of the Danube River near the Black Sea and surrounded by marshes. It was at the most easterly point of the Danubian border in Roman times and probably served as a supply centre for the fleet.

== History of the Site ==
The region was inhabited during the Second Iron Age by the Getae or Dacians as is evident by the discovery of several cremation burials within a possible necropolis that dates to the 4th-2nd centuries BC.

The original fort was made of timber and turf constructed during the Flavian period, but as the fort gained importance and a regular garrison was established along the Danube, the fort was rebuilt in stone during the reign of Trajan by vexillations of legions Legio I Italica and Legio XI Claudia.

Although the original layout of the Trajanic fort is largely covered by later reconstruction, the plan seems to have been typical of a 2nd century fort layout composed of a rectangular defensive wall, rectangular towers and a gate in the middle of each of the walls.

Early connections to the Roman fleet and its maritime activities at Halmyris are confirmed from epigraphic evidence mentioning the existence of a mariner's village or vicus classicorum (unique in the Roman empire).

Early in the fort's history, the Goths from the North crossed the Danube and conquered the fort. It was re-captured by the Romans and rebuilt with significant alteration during the Tetrarchy period. The new layout of the fort walls consisted of an irregular polygon bolstered by 15 towers and at least two well-defended gateways in the north and the west. Structures found within the fort include numerous barracks, a private thermae or bathhouse and a basilica.

Saints Epictetus and Astion had arrived at Halmyris in 273 when Epictetus was 47 years old and Astion only 18. They were said to perform many miracles but in 290 AD during the persecutions ordered by Diocletian, they were martyred at Halmyris. Their bodies were buried elsewhere but transferred to the city in the 4th century by Constantine the Great into a new basilica in which they were uncovered between 2001 and 2004 in the crypt. In the early 4th century the fortress went through a particularly prosperous period, becoming one of the 15 most important towns of the Scythia Minor.

During the late Roman period two units of the military fleet, Classis in Plateypegiis and Musculi Schytici (which had shallow-draft ships, suited for the Danube Delta) may have been hosted by this city.

In the winter of 384/5, the Danube froze, allowing the tribes to the north to cross and sack Halmyris.

A series of earthquakes in the 4th century and later damaged the city and the course of the Danube changed leading to the silting up of Halmyris' harbour which decreased its economic and strategic importance. The final period of occupation seems to correspond with the reconstruction of the fort by the emperor Justinian. Additionally, Halmyris became the site of one of the major bishoprics in the province as well as being named as one of the fifteen most important towns in the province of Scythia.

Halmyris gradually lost its importance and was abandoned.

== The city ==
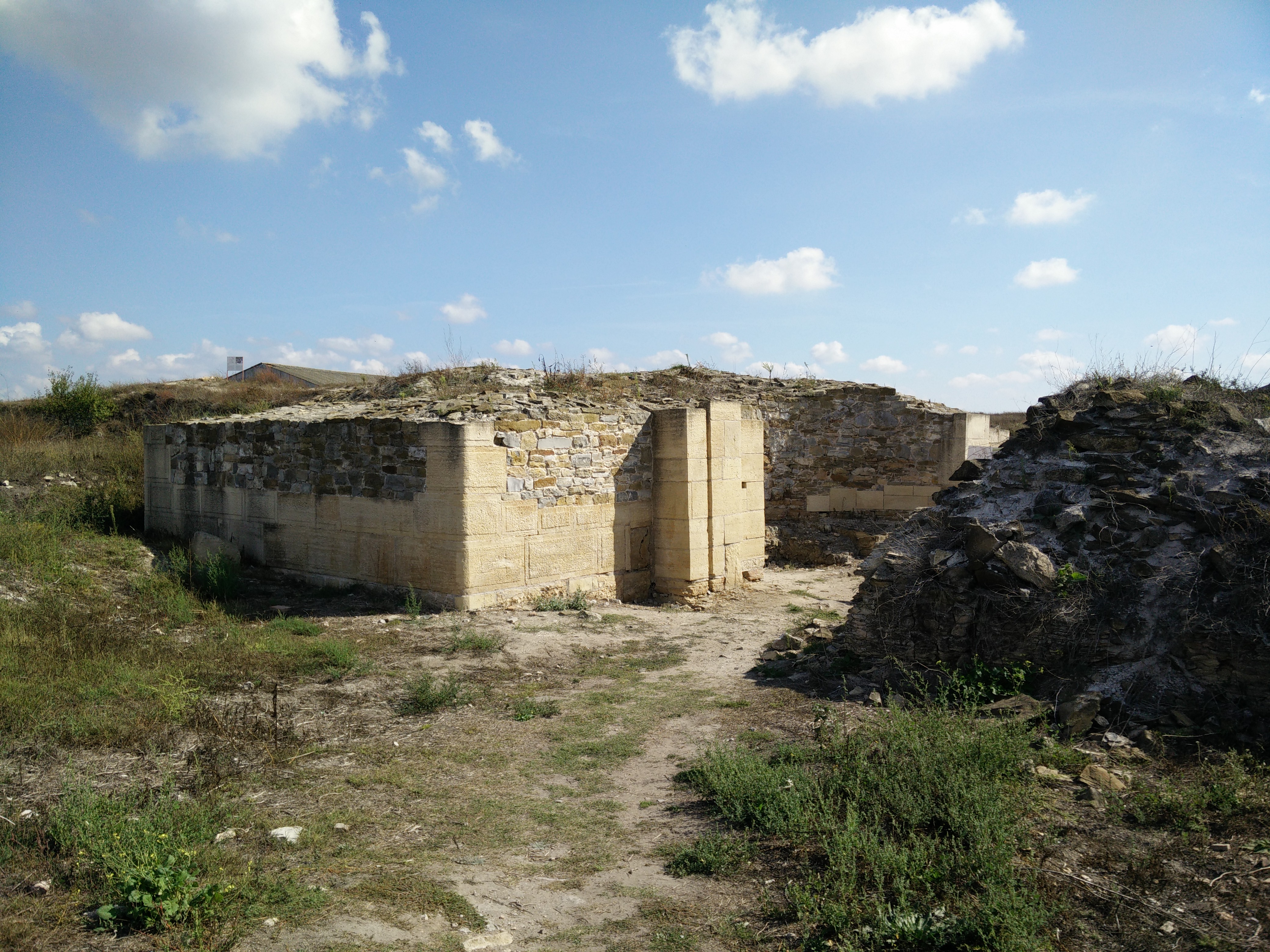
West gate

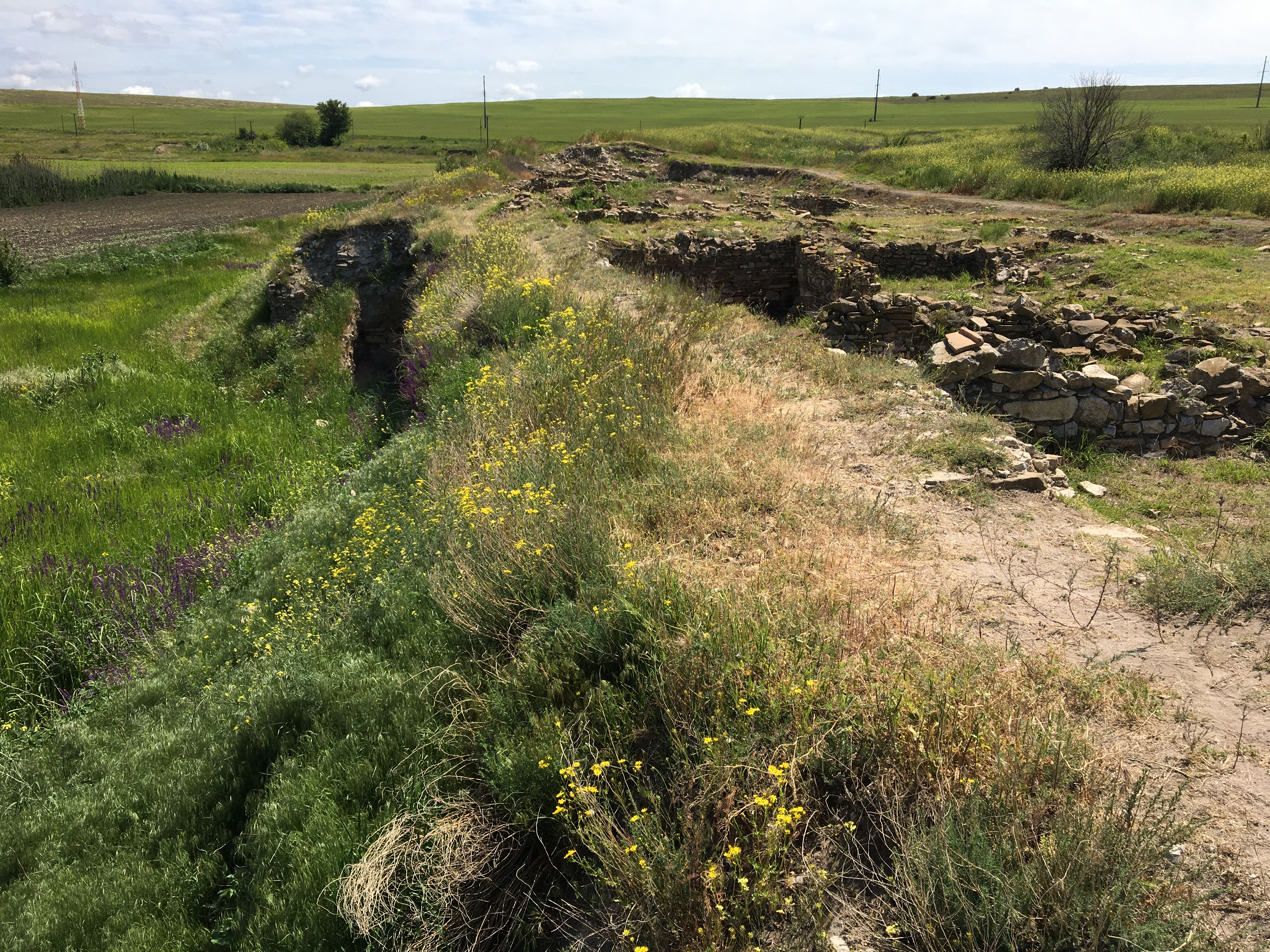
East walls

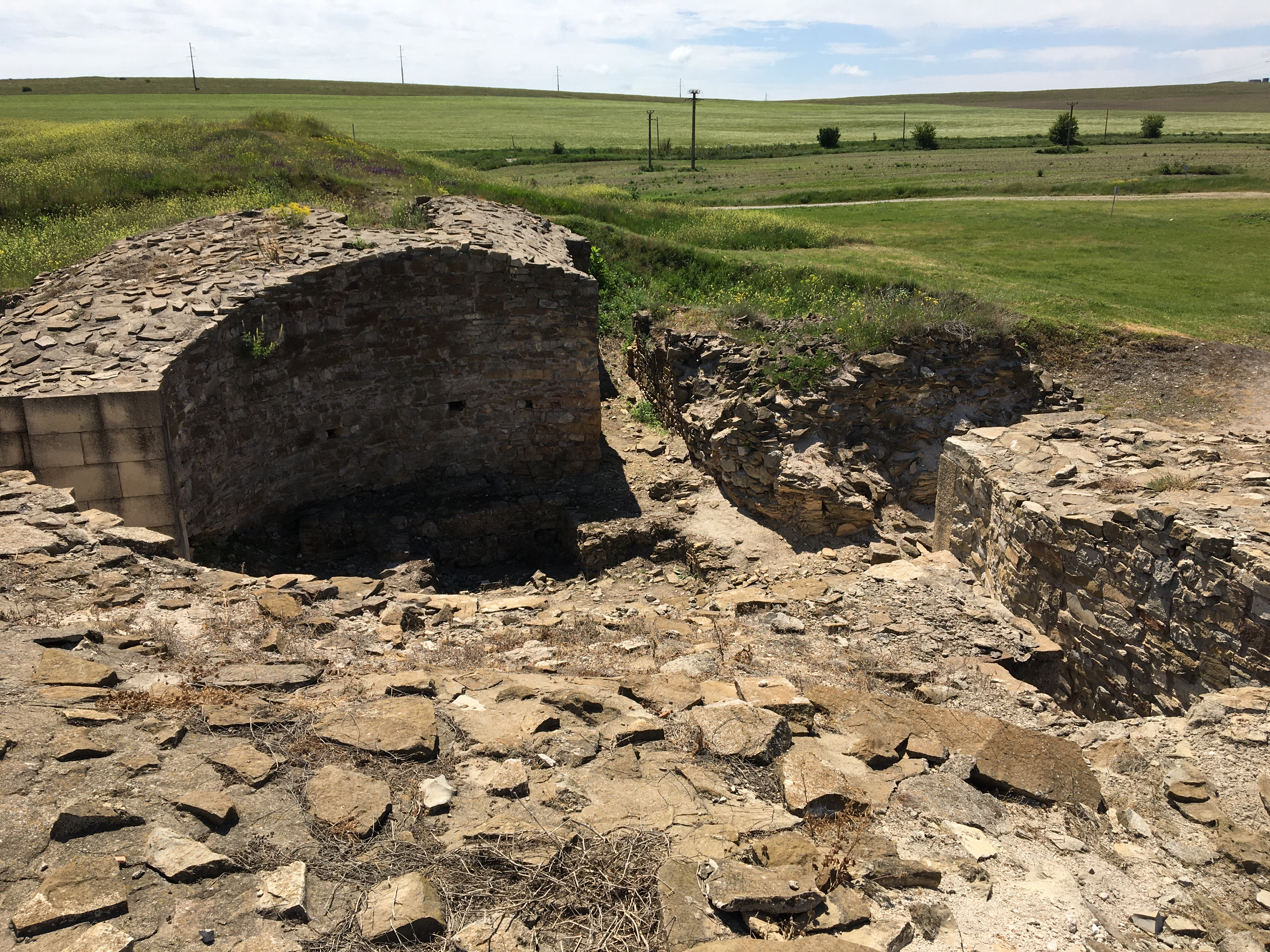
West Gate

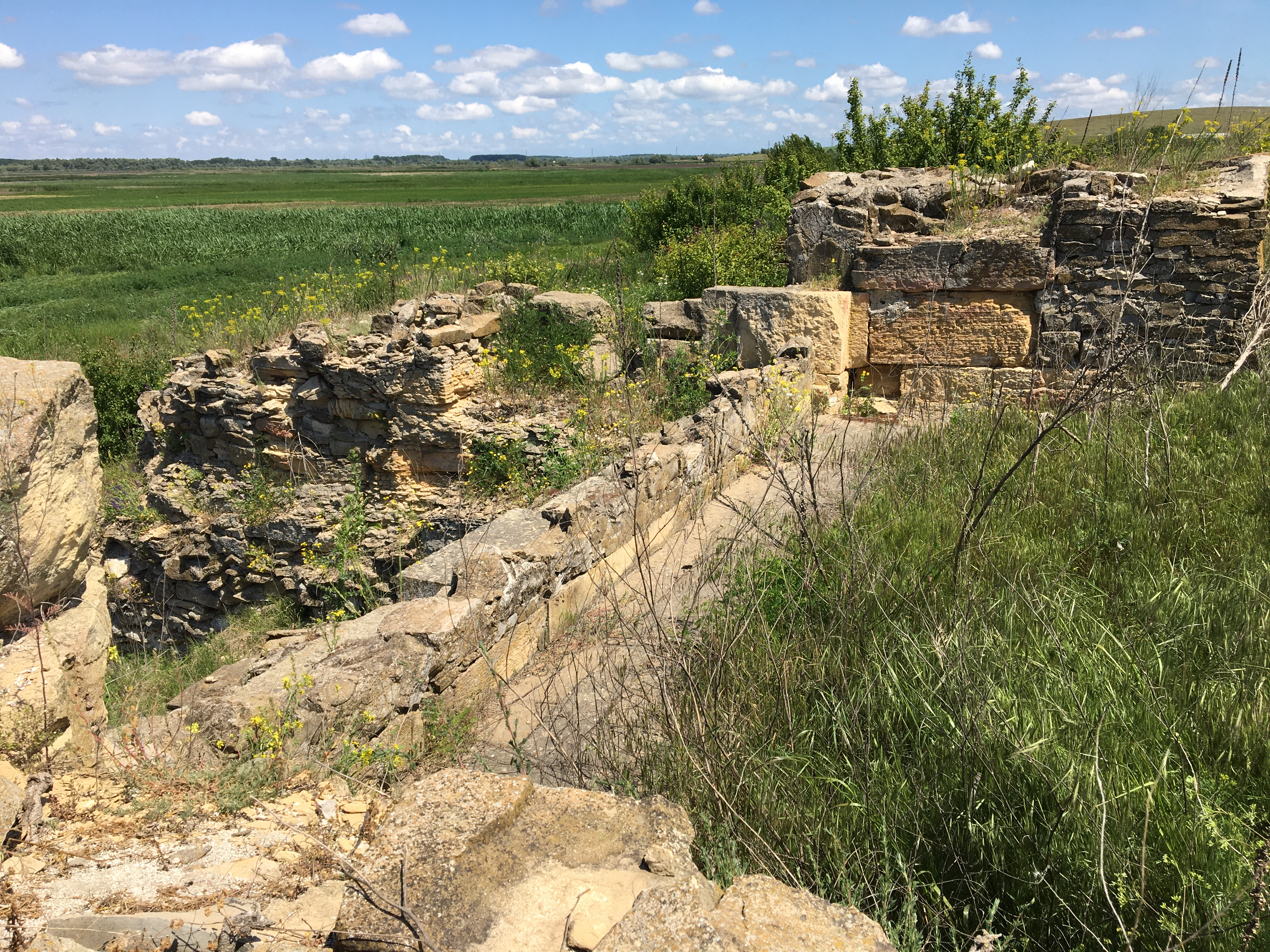
Blocked north Gate

The main western gate opened on to the main Roman Limes road that ran along the entire Danube linking all the forts. In Trajan's era it was built with two flanking rectangular towers in cyclopean ashlars by vexillations of Legio I Italica and Legio XI Claudia. In the 3rd century it was converted into a "courtyard"-type gate for better defence. In the late 3rd c. it was completely rebuilt as a round interior "courtyard"-type with successive gateways flanked by massive concrete bastions.

The North gate opened onto the Danube and was for pedestrians. Vitruvian principles seem to have been followed for foundations of a building close to a water course: a stable three-sided tough concrete platform also avoided moisture infiltration into the limestone blocks of the rest of the building with two rectangular towers built of cyclopean blocks, like the west gate, flanking a 3.4 m wide gateway. In the 280's during the general reconstruction initiated by Aurelian (r.270-275) or Probus (r.276-282) it was completely dismantled and two monumental U-shaped towers were built flanking a 6.15 m wide vaulted gateway using stone from the previous phase and also votive altars and tombstones from the early necropolis. It was finished during the Tetrarchic period in 301-305. In the late 4th century massive repairs on both tower foundations consolidated them due to slipping near the river. The gate was finally blocked in the second half of the 6th century when the Danube had moved away.

The baths were built in the 4th century near the northern gate with three pools. The praetorium was at the crossing of the two main streets in the centre of the fort. Four 4th century AD barrack blocks were located against the west wall of the fort and continued in use till the 6th c. Barracks no. 2 is the longest and its lay-out and interior arrangement would indicate that it was occupied by a high ranking officer. The northern stone and brick wall collapsed due very likely to an earthquake towards the end of the 6th century and is still visible. Barracks no. 3 is the largest and by far the best preserved. A street separated the barrack blocks from the basilica which was of a later date (mid to second half of the 6th century).

=== Paleochristian basilica ===
The early Christian basilica is placed centrally, built after 324 under Constantine I. It was initially a rectangular central aisled (nave) building with an entrance from the west, a forecourt (atrium) and a semicircular space roofed with a half-dome, exedra or apse. In the mid 4th century it was significantly enlarged with 2.5 m-wide aisles on both sides with columns supporting the roof extensions. In the third major phase the apse was enclosed into a rectangular building parallel to the N-S oriented street, the cardo maximus, leaving a 4.0-4.5 m wide ambulatorium behind the altar. A long E-W oriented hall was built against the south side of the basilica. These extensions coincided with the transformation of Halmyris into a bishopric of the province of Scythia.

The earliest basilica was built with a vaulted crypt with walls and ceiling painted with vegetal motifs and with an inscription in Greek including ACTION (Astion), and a Greek verb indicating martyrdom. The human bones found in the crypt and research into the crypt gave clear historical and archaeological evidence that it was dedicated to the two martyrs who died at the end of the 3rd century.

== Excavations ==
The fort was excavated by the late Prof. Mihail Zahariade and Dr. John Karavas in 2010-2019.

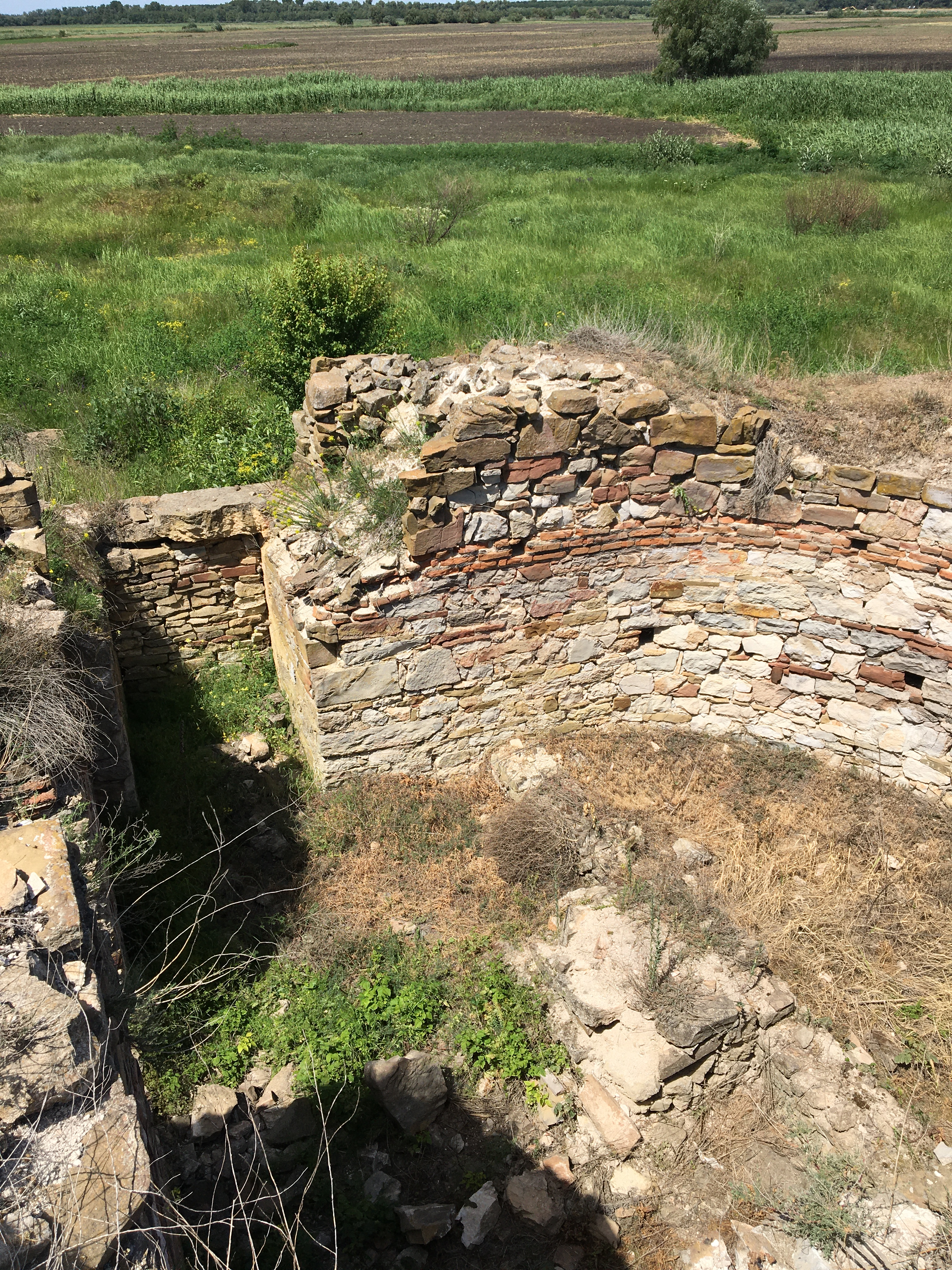
Northeast bastion

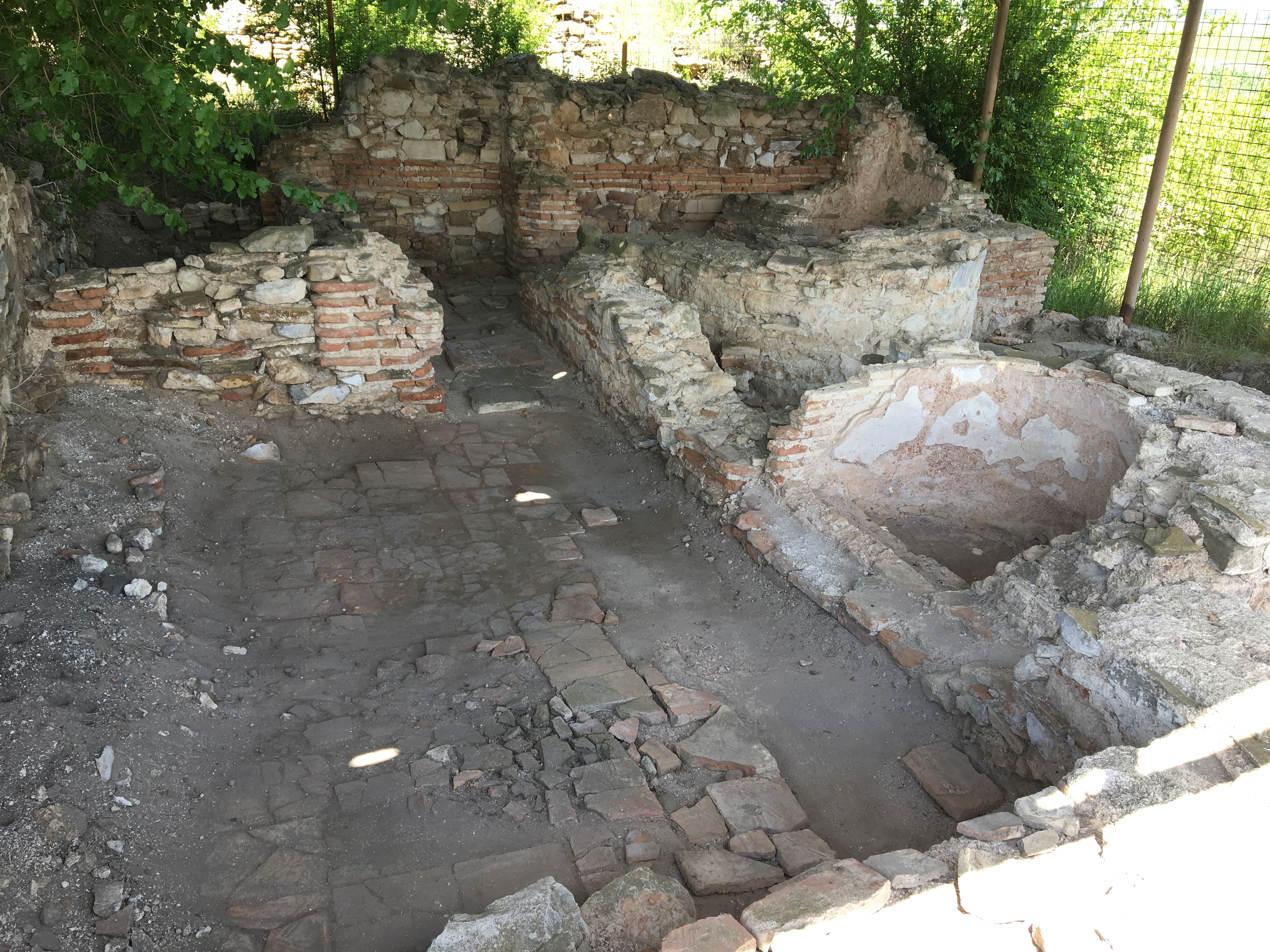
Roman baths

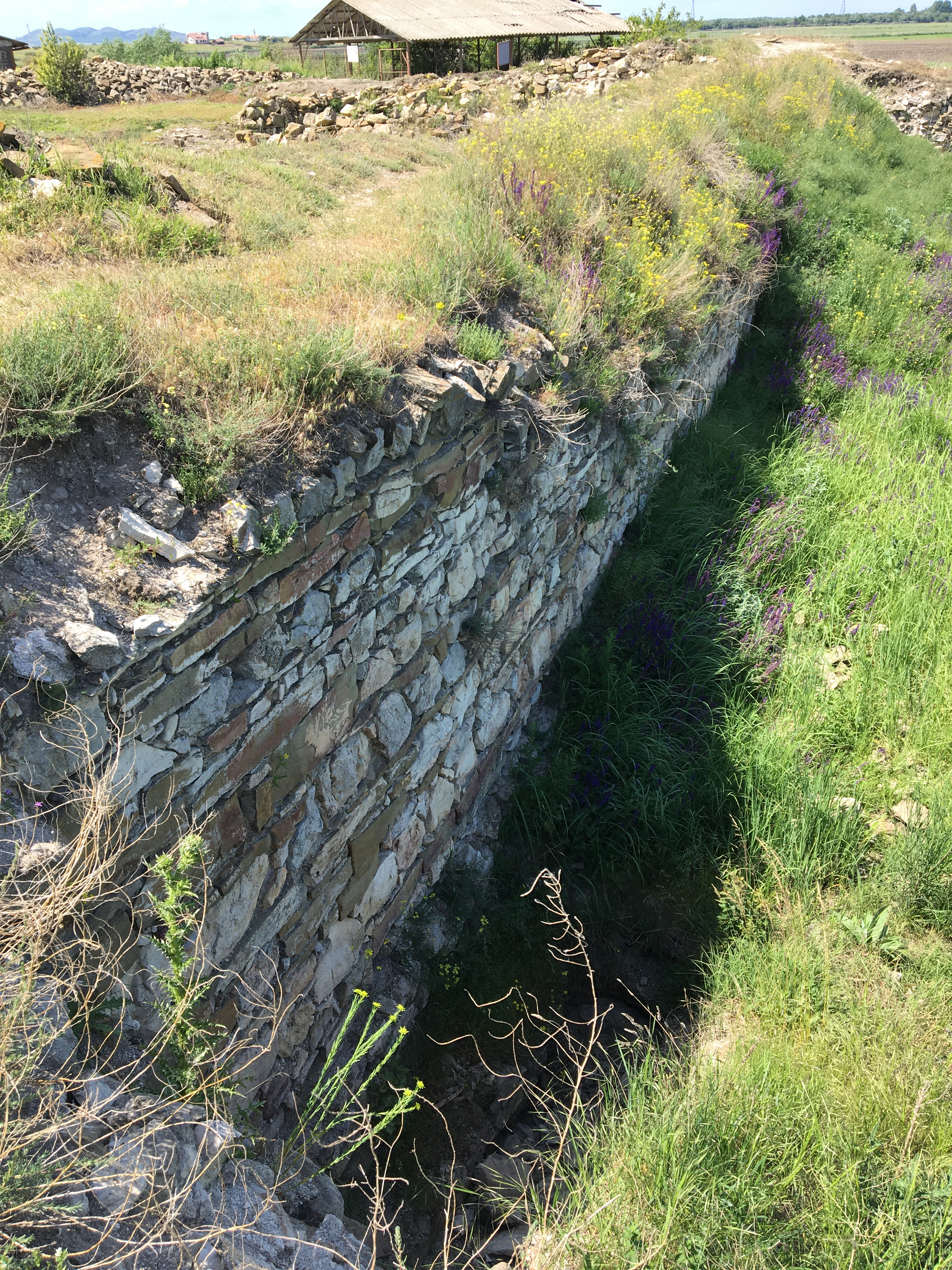
East walls

== See also ==
- Histria
- List of ancient towns in Scythia Minor
- List of castra
- Peuce Island
