= Zoltes =

Thracian Chieftain (c. 200 BC)

Zoltes was a chief of the southern Thracians, living in the Haemus mountains area. Leading small groups, he often made incursions into the Pontic cities and within their territories. He attacked the city of Histria, calling off the siege only after having received 7500 drachmas and 5 talents (approx. 30000 drachmas).

== Etymology ==
In Baltic mythology, the grass snake (Lithuanian: žaltys, Latvian: zalktis) is seen as a sacred animal.
