= Gârliciu =

- Commune
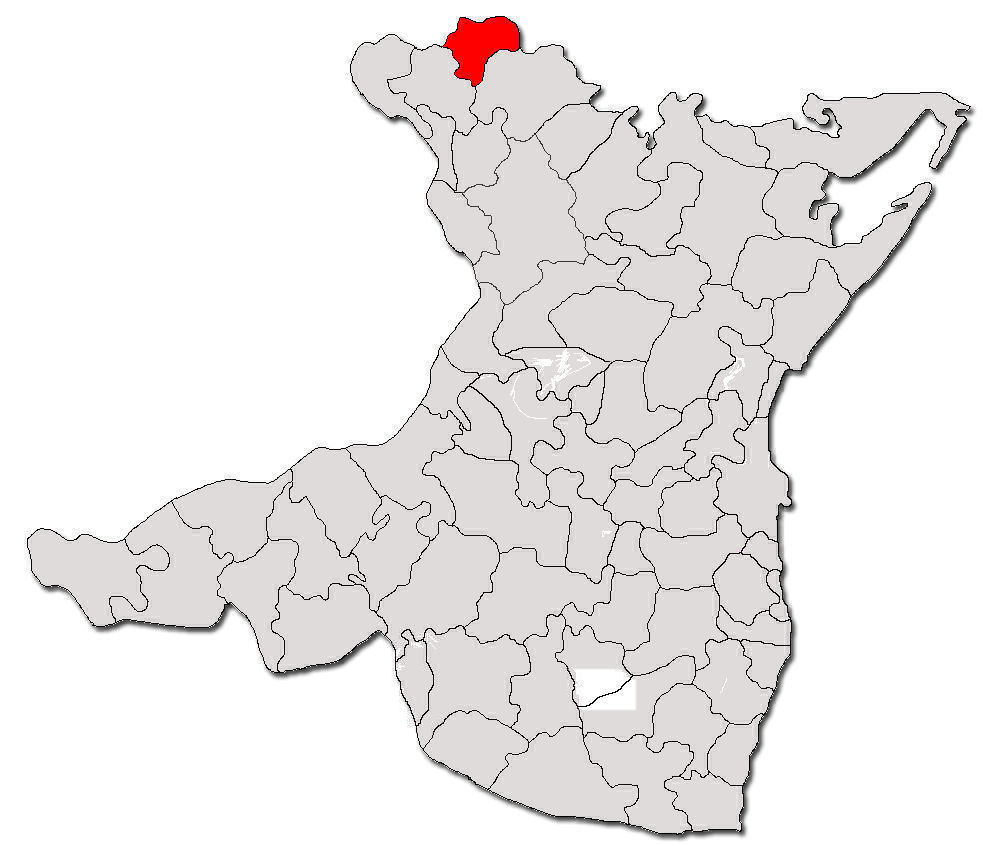
- Location in Constanța County

- Location in Romania
- Coordinates: 44°46′N 28°5′E
- Country: Romania
- County: Constanța

Government
  - Mayor (2020–2024): Anica Tufă (ADER)
- Area: 61.91 km^{2} (23.90 sq mi)
- Population (2021-12-01): 1,376
  - Density: 22.23/km^{2} (57.56/sq mi)
- Time zone: UTC+02:00 (EET)
  - Summer (DST): UTC+03:00 (EEST)
- Vehicle reg.: CT
- Website: www.primaria-girliciu.ro

Gârliciu (Romanian pronunciation: [ɡɨrˈlit͡ʃju]) is a commune in Constanța County, Northern Dobruja, Romania, containing the village with the same name.

== History ==
4.5 km south of Gârliciu is the site of the Roman fort Cius located in the Roman province of Moesia in the 1st century AD and part of the defensive frontier system of the Limes Moesiae along the Danube.

It was built on a hill at the end of a narrow peninsula parallel to the Danube, today on the north-east side of Hisarlâk lake, although the river is today more than 4.5 km north-westwards.

There were two stone forts with ditch and ramparts, one within the other of approximately 85 x 60 m and 120 x 120 m respectively.

The garrison of the early fort was cohors I Lusitanorum Cyrenaica, until its movement upstream to Nigrinianis (later Candidiana).

Reconstruction, ordered by emperor Valens, was done by milites primani headed by a tribunus Marcianus and a praepositus Ursicinus, supervised by provincial governor Flavius Stercorius, as described in an oration by Themistios before the emperor at Constantinople in early 370.

Cius is included in the Itinerarium Antonini, at 10000 feet from Carsium (Hârșova) and 14000 feet from Beroe (castrum) (Piatra Frecăței).

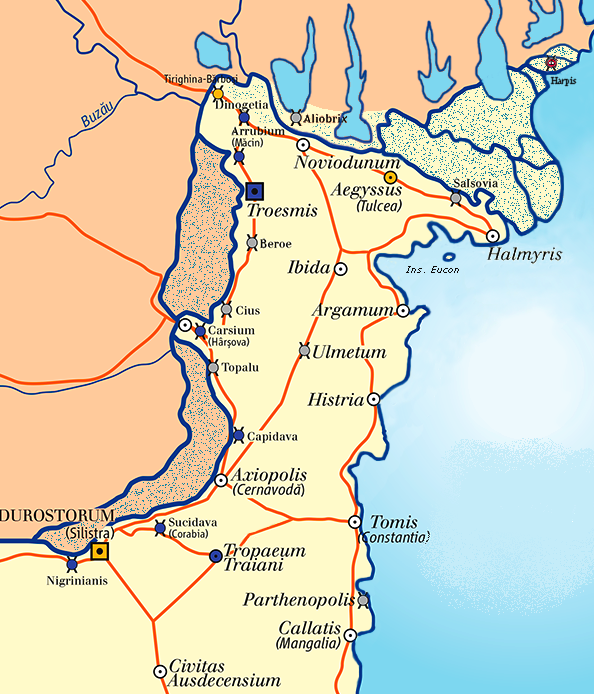
Eastern Moesia and Limes Moesiae

== Demographics ==
At the 2011 census, Gârliciu had 1,511 Romanians. No other ethnicities were recorded.
