= Capidava (spider) =

Scientific classification
- Kingdom: Animalia
- Phylum: Arthropoda
- Subphylum: Chelicerata
- Class: Arachnida
- Order: Araneae
- Infraorder: Araneomorphae
- Family: Salticidae
- Subfamily: Salticinae
- Genus: Capidava; Simon, 1902

Type species
- C. auriculata Simon, 1902

Species
- 6, see text

Genus of spiders

Capidava is a genus of South American jumping spiders that was first described by Eugène Louis Simon in 1902.

== Species ==
As of June 2019 it contains six species, found only in Brazil and Guyana:

- Capidava annulipes Caporiacco, 1947 – Guyana
- Capidava auriculata Simon, 1902 (type) – Brazil
- Capidava biuncata Simon, 1902 – Brazil
- Capidava dubia Caporiacco, 1947 – Guyana
- Capidava saxatilis Soares & Camargo, 1948 – Brazil
- Capidava uniformis Mello-Leitão, 1940 – Guyana
