= Altina, Scythia =

Ancient settlement or fortress in Scythia Minor, in modern Romania

Altina was an ancient settlement or fortress in Scythia Minor. The site is now the modern village of Oltina.
