= Topalu =

- Commune
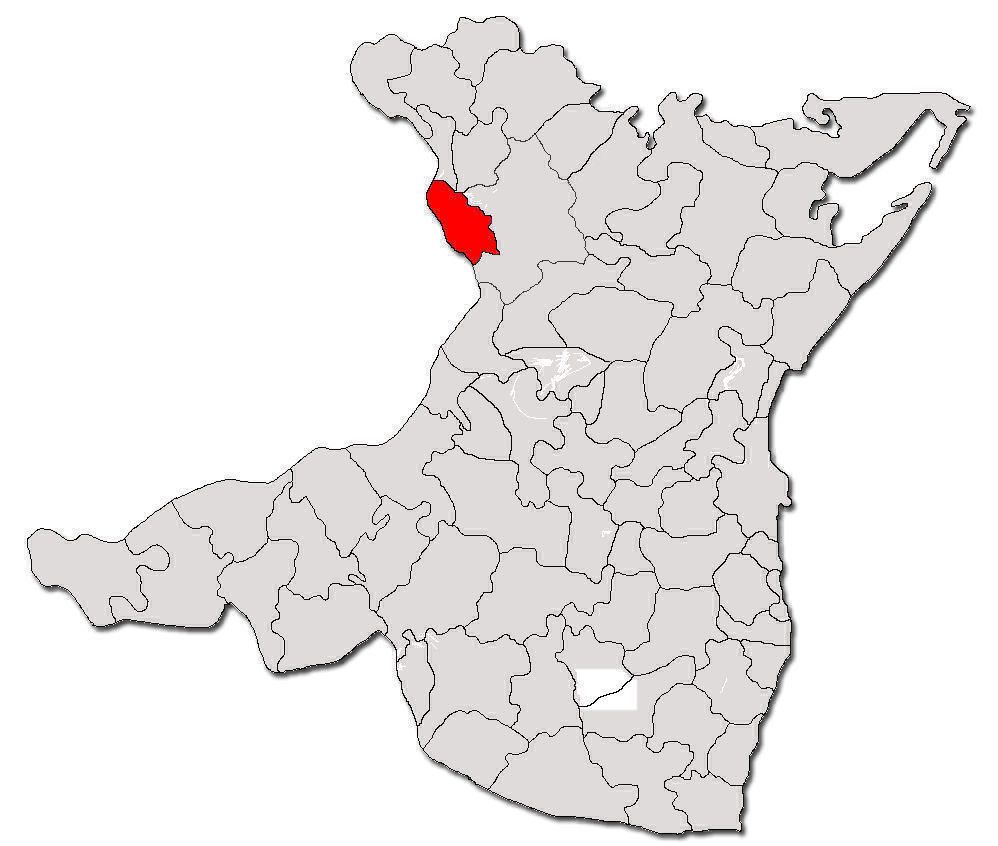
- Location in Constanța County

- Location in Romania
- Coordinates: 44°33′N 28°3′E
- Country: Romania
- County: Constanța
- Subdivisions: Topalu, Capidava

Government
  - Mayor (2020–2024): Constantin Baltă (PSD)
- Area: 79.29 km^{2} (30.61 sq mi)
- Population (2021-12-01): 1,517
  - Density: 19.13/km^{2} (49.55/sq mi)
- Time zone: UTC+02:00 (EET)
  - Summer (DST): UTC+03:00 (EEST)
- Vehicle reg.: CT
- Website: www.primariatopalu.ro

Topalu (Romanian pronunciation: [toˈpalu]) is a commune located on the right bank of the Danube in Constanța County, Northern Dobruja, Romania.

== Administration ==
The commune includes two villages:

- Topalu (historical name: Turkish: Topal)
- Capidava (historical names: Calichioi, Turkish: Kaleköy)

== Demographics ==
Historical population
Year	Pop.	±%
2002	1,951	—
2011	1,785	−8.5%
2021	1,517	−15.0%
Source: National Institute of Statistics

At the 2011 census, Topalu had 1,707 Romanians (99.94%), 1 others (0.06%).

== History ==
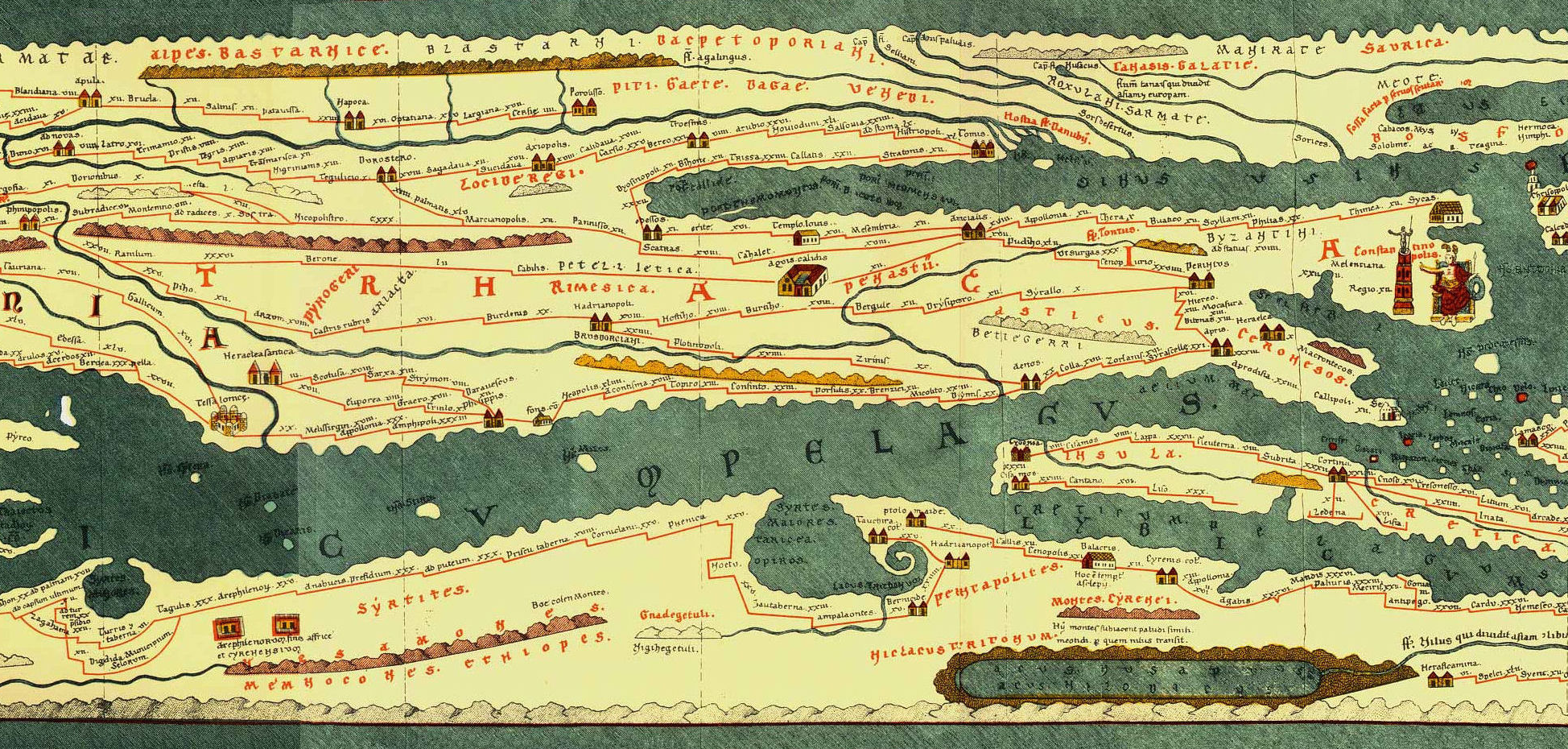
Capidava on Tabula Peutingeriana (upper center)

=== Tabula Peutingeriana ===
Capidava is depicted in the form Calidava/Calidaua in Segmentum VIII of Tabula Peutingeriana (1st-4th century AD) on a Roman road between Axiopolis and Carsium. The map provides accurate data on the distances between Axiopolis, Capidava and Carsium. These distances coincide with the distances between the present localities of Hinog - Capidava and Capidava - Hârșova. This is also verified by the discovery of military marking pillar at Seimenii Mici that indicates the distance of 18,000 feet (27 km) from Axiopolis to Capidava.

=== Ancient times ===
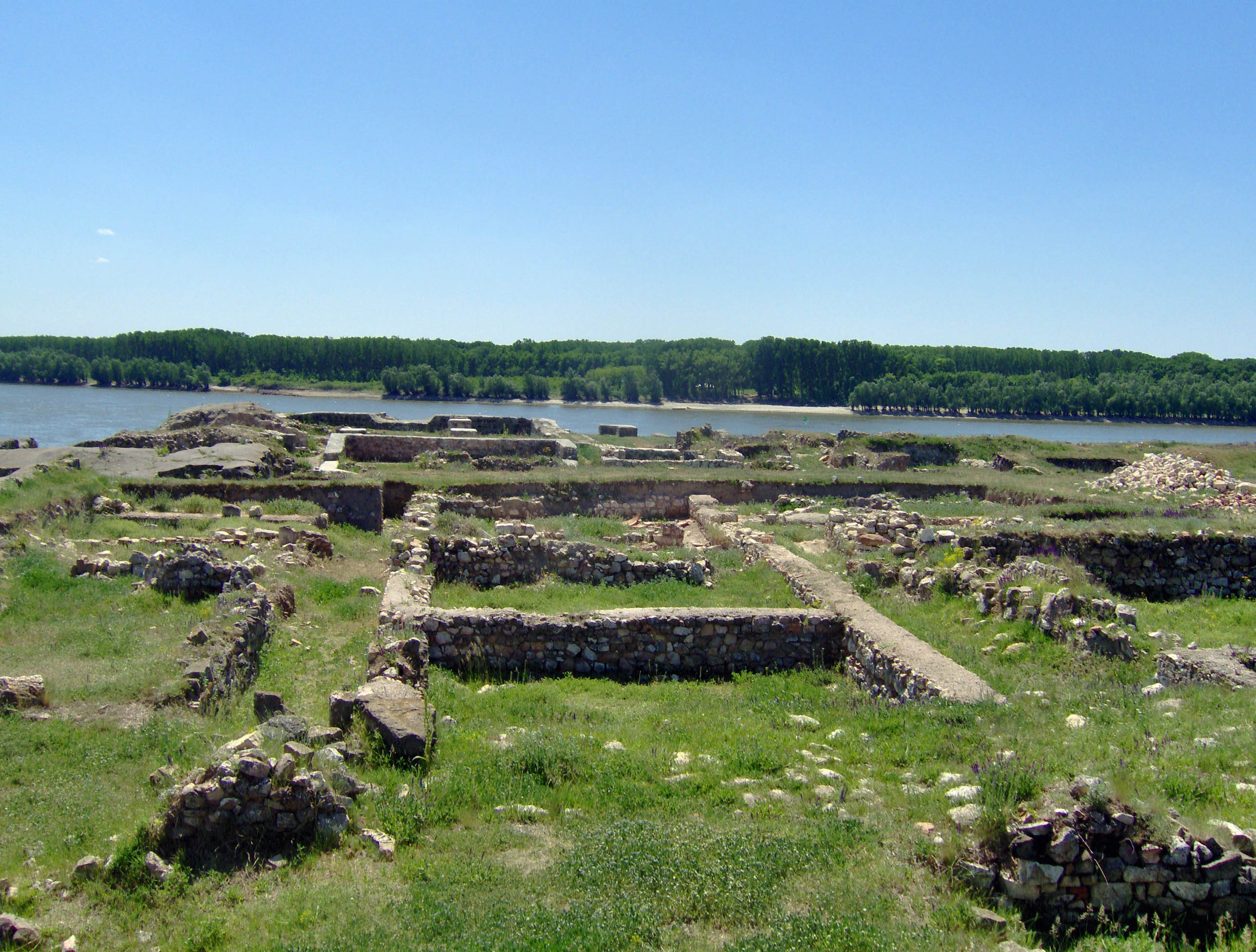
Ruins of the Geto-Dacian fortress Capidava

The village Capidava is the site of the fortified Geto-Dacian center with the same name, Capidava.

After the Roman conquest of Dacia it became a Roman city and castra in the province of Scythia Minor (modern Dobruja).

== Etymology ==
Capidava is a Getic toponym, meaning the "curve fortified settlement".

== See also ==
- Dacia
- Roman Dacia
- List of ancient towns in Scythia Minor
- List of ancient cities in Thrace and Dacia
- Dacian davae
