= Slava Cercheză =

Slava Cercheză Черкезская Слава
- Commune
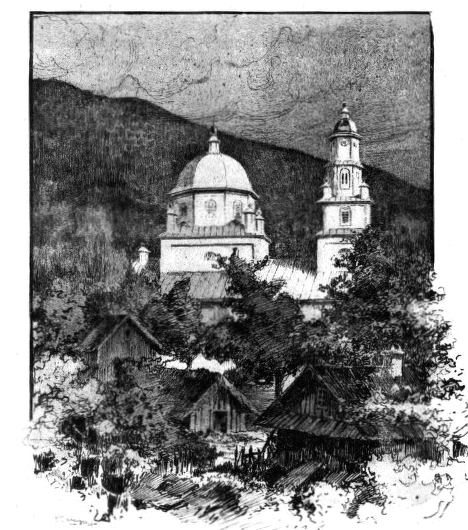
- Drawing of Uspenia Monastery in the early 20th century

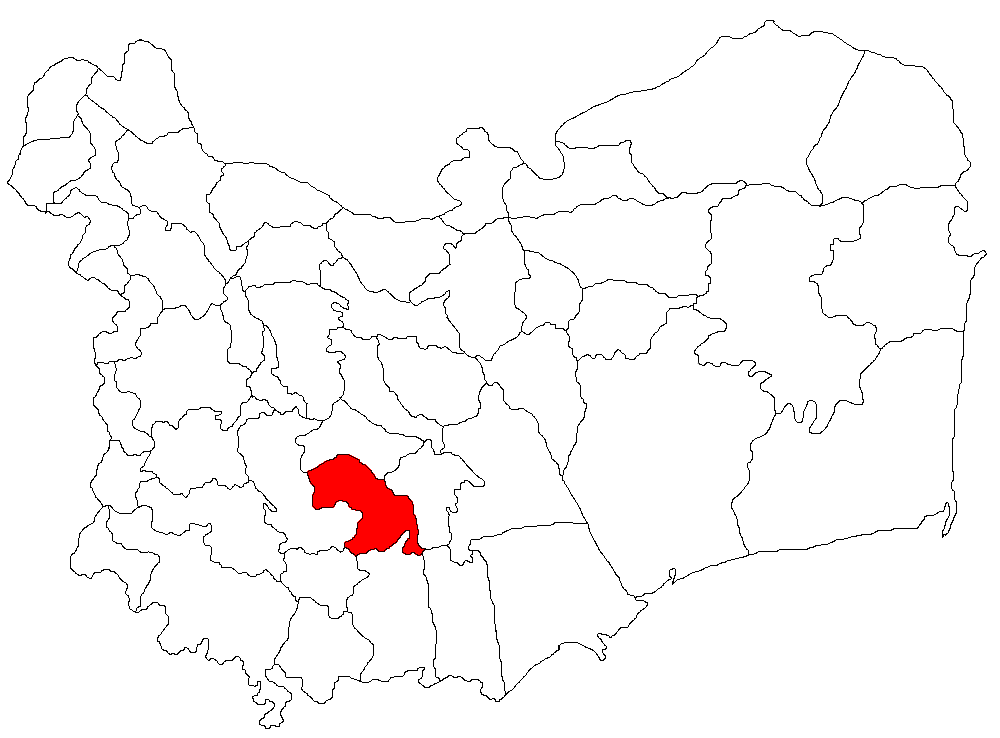
- Location in Tulcea County

- Location in Romania
- Coordinates: 44°54′N 28°32′E
- Country: Romania
- County: Tulcea
- Subdivisions: Slava Cercheză, Slava Rusă

Government
  - Mayor (2024–2028): Valentin Sereev (PNL)
- Area: 106.25 km^{2} (41.02 sq mi)
- Elevation: 91 m (299 ft)
- Population (2021-12-01): 1,962
  - Density: 18.47/km^{2} (47.83/sq mi)
- Time zone: UTC+02:00 (EET)
  - Summer (DST): UTC+03:00 (EEST)
- Postal code: 827200
- Area code: +40 x40
- Vehicle reg.: TL
- Website: www.primariaslavacercheza.ro

Slava Cercheză (Russian: Черкезская Слава) is a commune in Tulcea County, Northern Dobruja, Romania. Its name means the Cherkess (Circassian) Slava, in reference to the Dobrujan Circassian community that used to inhabit the village before the Russo-Turkish War (1877–1878). Besides the titular village, the commune also includes the village of Slava Rusă (Russian: Русская Слава, Russian Slava).

Situated near the site of ancient Libida, the commune is home to an important Russian-speaking Lipovan community (79.9% of the population) dating from the late 17th or early 18th century. The Uspenia monastery in the village of Slava Rusă is the seat of the Orthodox Old Rite Eparchy of Slava, founded in the 19th century, with authority over most of Dobruja. The Vovidenia convent is also found in the village. 20% of the inhabitants are Romanians.
