= Histria (ancient city) =

Greek colony on the Black Sea (est. 7th Century BC)

- Ἰστρίη (Ancient Greek)
- Istros
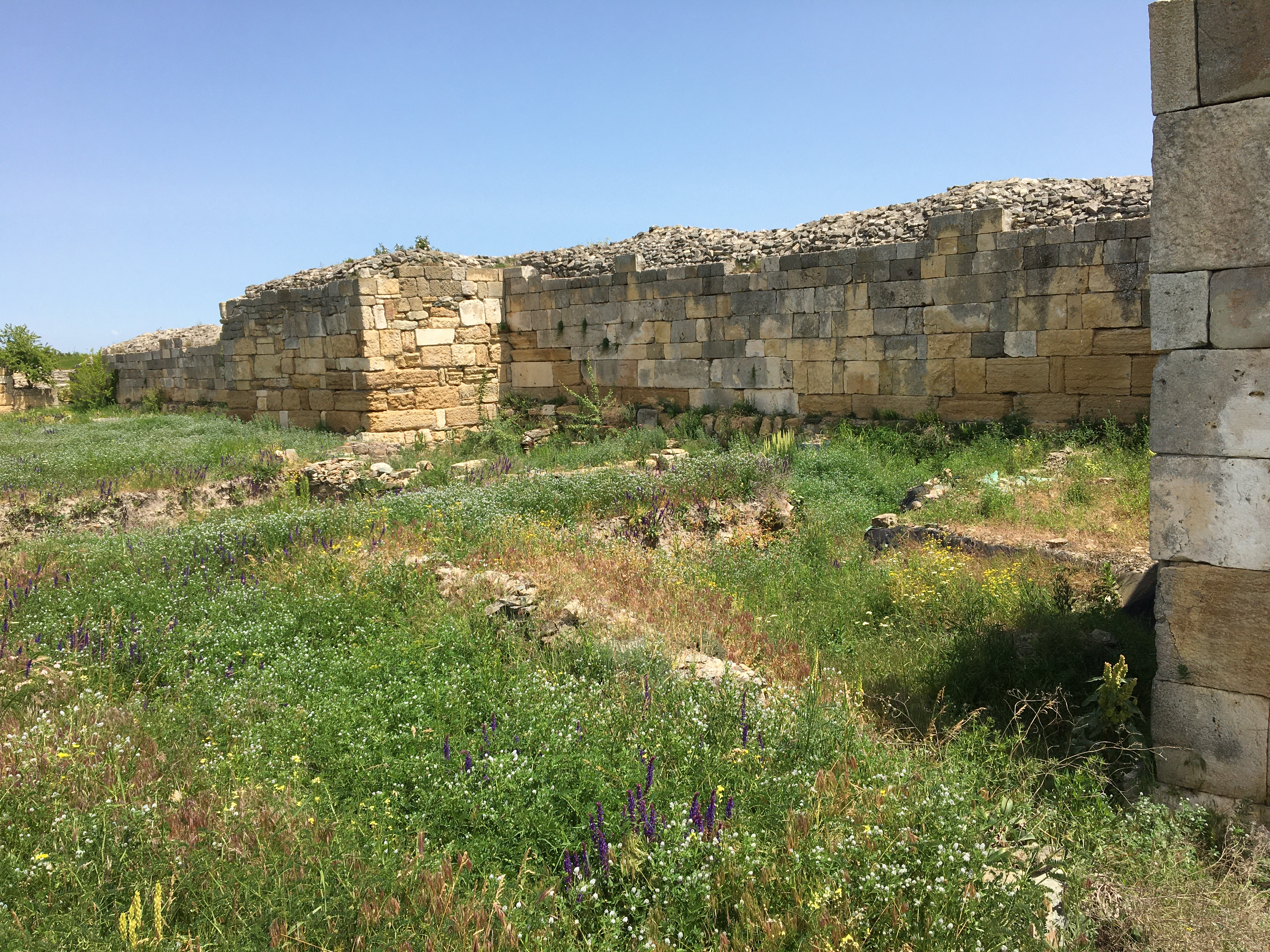
- City walls

- Location within Romania
- 44°32′51″N 28°46′29″E
- Type: fortified city, settlement
- Location: Istria, Constanța, Romania
- Region: Dobruja

History
- Built: mid-7th century BC
- Abandoned: mid-7th century AD
- Event: Battle of Histria

Site notes
- Area: 82 ha (200 acres)
- Archaeologists: Ernest Desjardins, Vasile Pârvan,
- Condition: Ruined
- Owner: Public
- Public access: Yes

Histria or Istros (Ancient Greek: Ἰστρίη) was founded as a Greek colony or polis (πόλις, city) on the western coast of the Black Sea near the mouth of the Danube (known as Ister in Ancient Greek) whose banks are today about 70 km away. In antiquity, it also bore the names Istropolis, Istriopolis, and Histriopolis (Ἰστρόπολις, Ἰστρία πόλις) or simply Istros/Histros (Ἴστρος). It is now located on the inland shore of a Black Sea lagoon, Lake Sinoe, north of Năvodari and near the modern town of Istria, province of Dobruja, Romania.

It may be considered the first urban settlement on today's Romanian territory, founded by Milesian settlers in the 7th century BC and inhabited for at least 1,200 years. Earlier settlements related to the Cucuteni–Trypillia culture precede the settlement at Histria by several millennia, however lack key aspects which characterize urbanization in the concept of Polis and in our modern world. Therefore, it may be most accurate to categorize the Cucuteni-Trypillia settlements as proto-cities, and Histria as the first planned city in Romania.

It was under Roman rule from the 1st century AD in the Roman province of Moesia. The Tabula Peutingeriana shows it 11 miles from Tomis and 9 miles from Ad Stoma.

Invasions during the 7th century AD rendered it indefensible, and the city was abandoned.

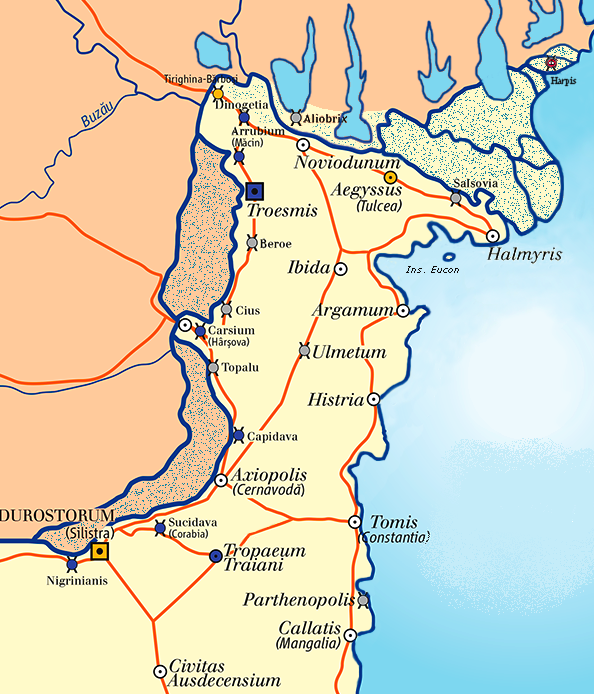
Eastern Moesia and Moesian Limes, and Ancient towns and colonies in modern Dobruja (ancient coastline)

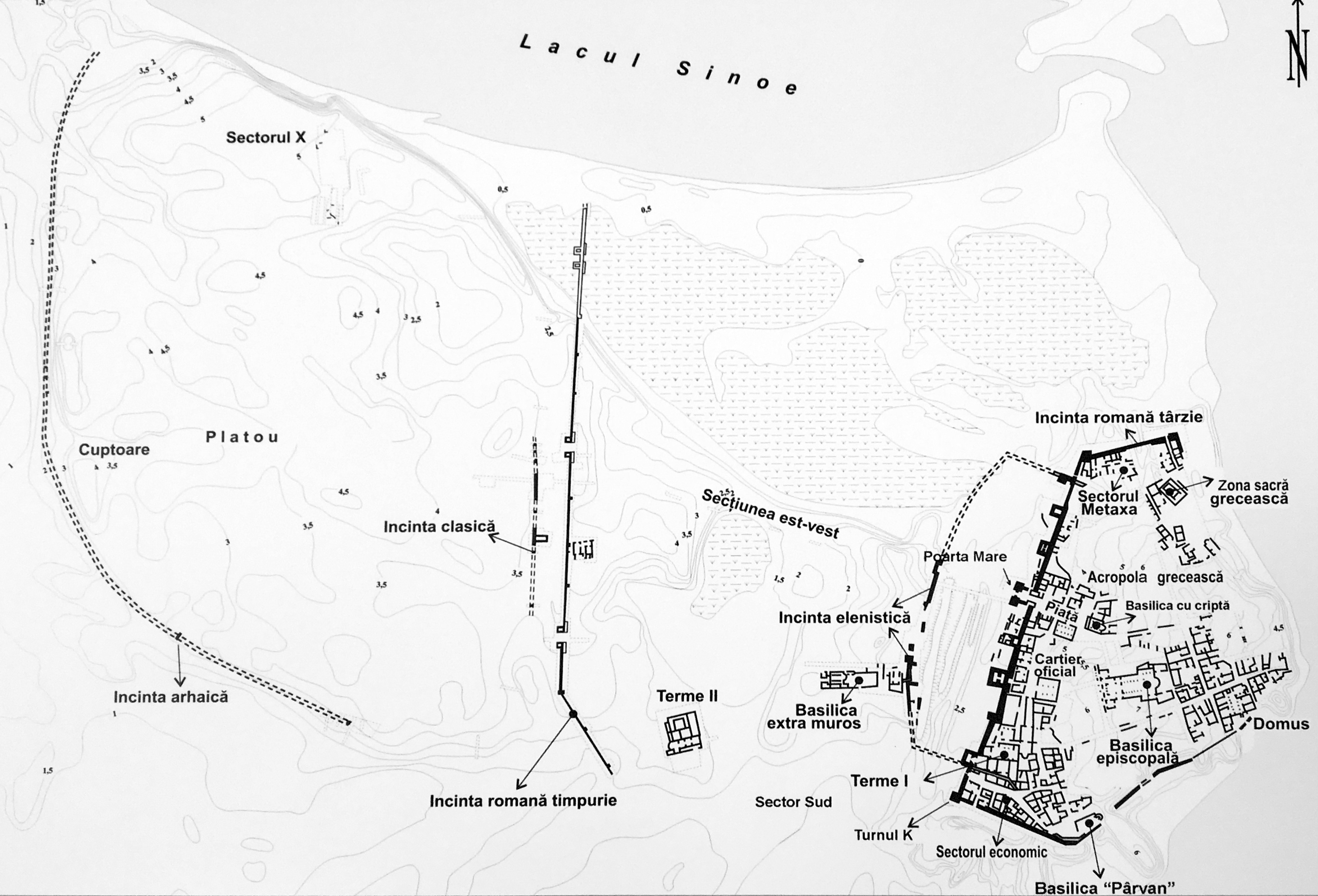
Plan of Histria

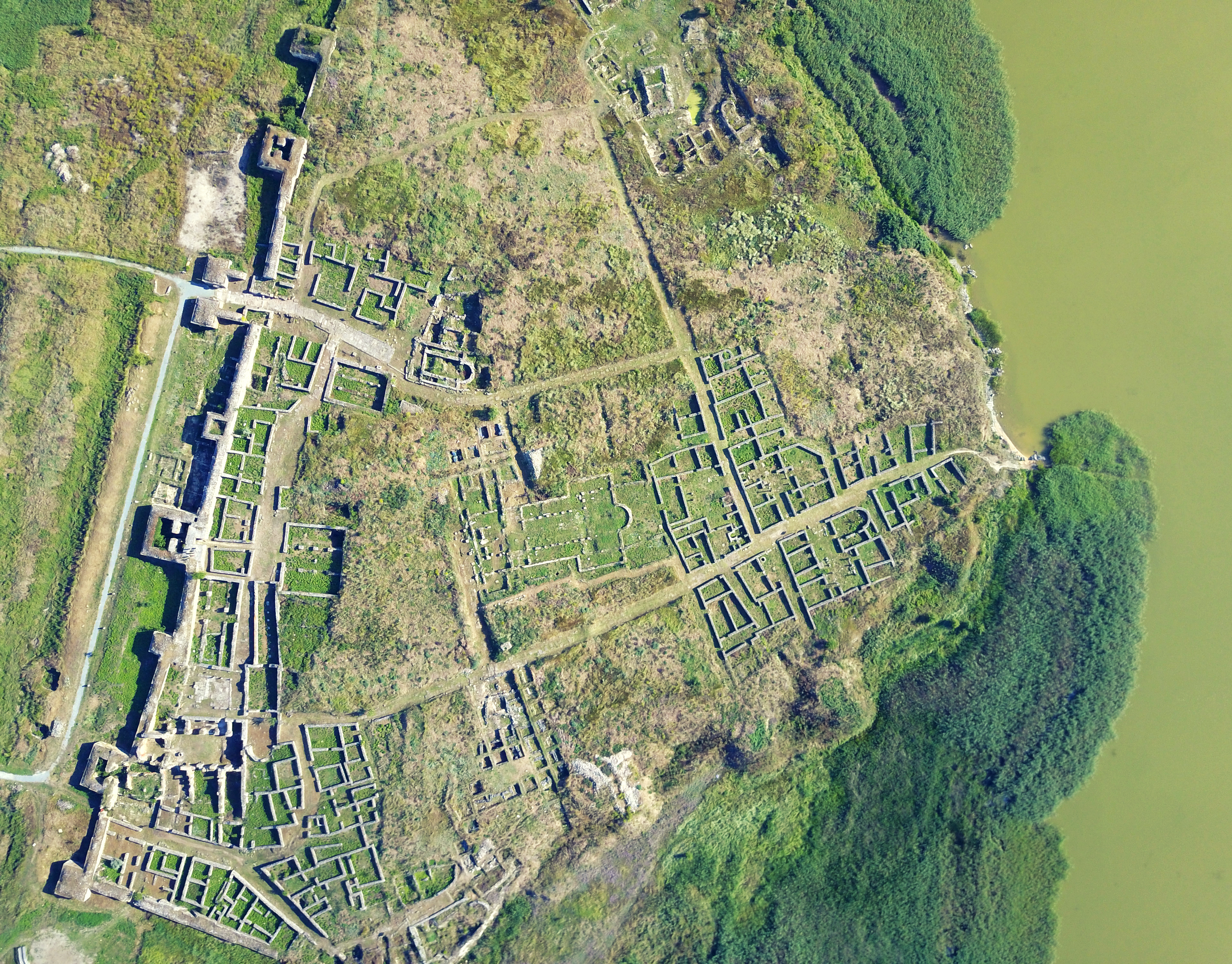
The site

== Location ==
Histria was situated on a peninsula on the Black Sea linked by marshy ground to the mainland and near the river known today as Istria. The ancient seashore has since been transformed into the western shore of Sinoe Lake, as the Danube's silt deposits formed a shoal which closed off the ancient coastline. Parts of the city lie under the murky waters of Lake Sinoe which at the time was an open northern bay, while another bay on the southern shore served as the port. The acropolis with sanctuaries was established on the highest point of the city overlooking the sea. The residential town of the 6th century was 1/2 mile (800 m) to the west of the acropolis.

== History ==
=== Background ===
In the Archaic age, Miletus, which Herodotus called "the jewel of Ionia", was one of the most active cities in Greek colonisation. It founded a large number of colonies admired by ancient writers such as Seneca the Elder, Strabo and Pliny, mostly in the Propontis (Sea of Marmara) and Black Sea regions. Many of these were identified and partially discovered in the last two centuries. The Milesian colonisation led to a fundamental change of the Black Sea region, integrating it as a Greek region for the first time in history. The first colonies were founded near the mouths of the great rivers, the Danube and the Don.

=== Greek period ===
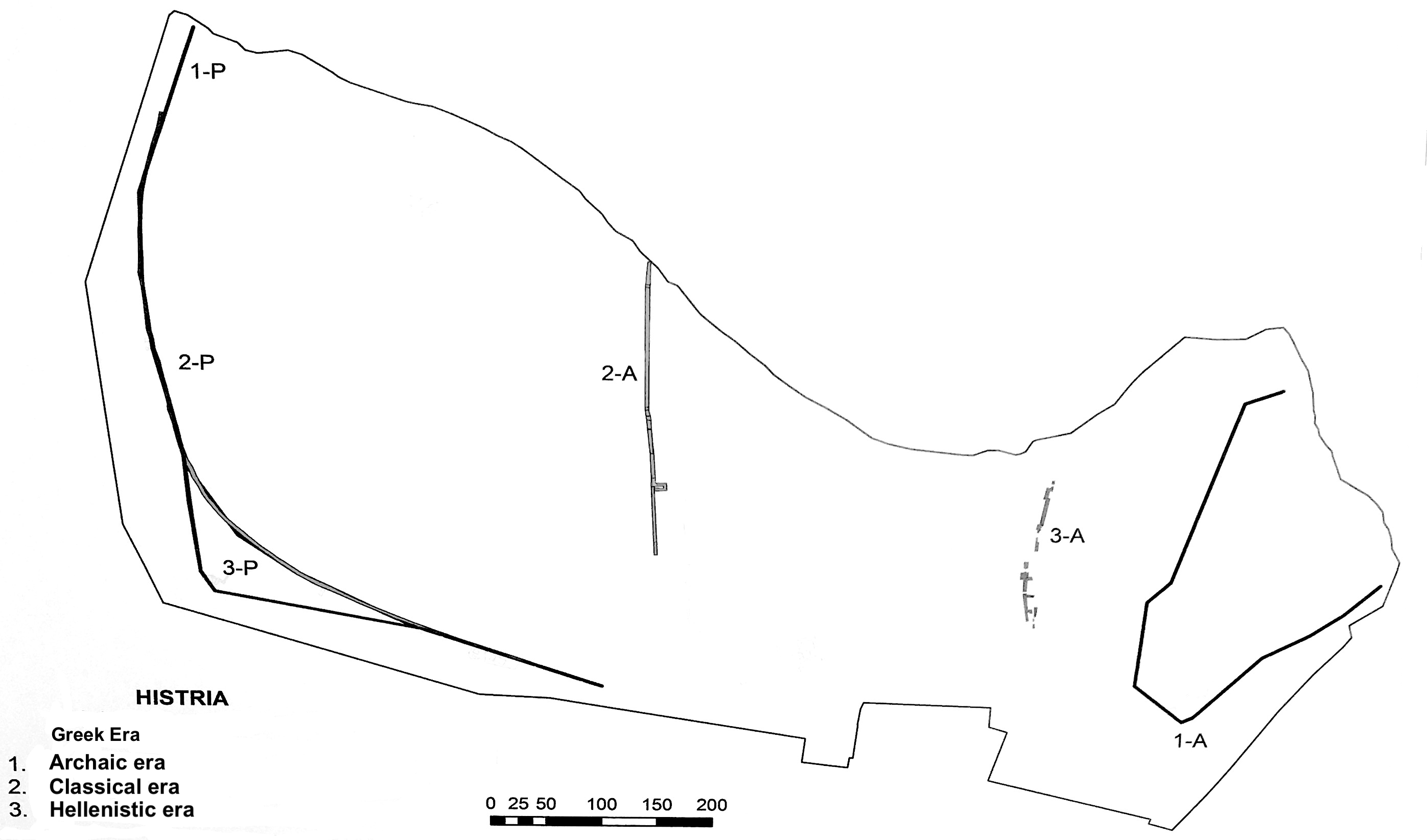
Evolution of Greek walls A=acropolis P=plateau

Established by Milesian settlers in order to facilitate trade with the native Getae, Histria is considered the oldest urban settlement on Romanian territory. Pseudo-Scymnus (ca 110 BC), dated its founding to 630 BC, while Eusebius of Caesarea set it during the time of the 33rd Olympic Games (657-6 BC). It is believed all six Milesian tribes (Greek: phylai) were represented in the colony, yet only four tribes are attested: the Aigikoreis, Argadeis, Boreis and Geleontes. It became a Greek city-state with its own large chora (territory) extending to approx. 20 km to the west. It was situated near fertile arable land with fishing and agriculture as additional sources of income.

Trade with the interior followed the foundation of Histria as demonstrated by finds of Attic black-figure pottery, coins, ornamental objects, an Ionian lebes and many fragments of amphoras found in great quantity at Histria, some imported but some local. Pottery, metal and glass objects were produced locally and increasingly before the mid-6th century. Its port traded soon after its establishment with intensive trade with large Greek cities to the south including Miletus, Rhodes, Samos and Athens. Histria flourished during the Archaic and Classical periods.

In 600–550 BC new city walls were built probably in connection with the frequent raids of the Scythians. Nevertheless, at the end of the 6th or beginning of the 5th c. BC the city was destroyed probably by the Scythians following the Scythian campaign of Darius I. It was rebuilt with new temples and industrial production increased.

In the 5th century BC Histria was situated between the Odrysian kingdom and the Scythians ruled by Ariapeithes who were in conflict. Histria was probably forced to join the Delian League and, following a revolution by inhabitants, passed from an oligarchy to democracy.

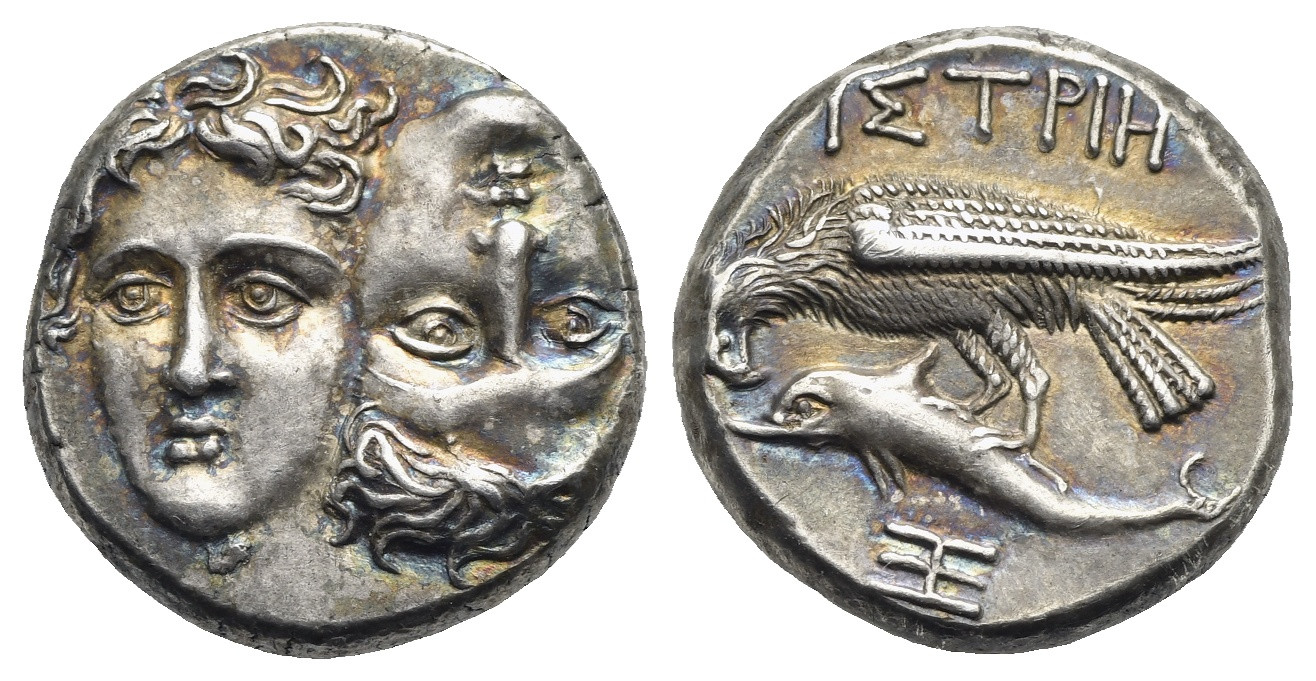
Silver drachm of Istros, 4th century BCE, with facing heads of the Dioskouroi and eagle on dolphin, ΙΣΤΡΙΗ (ISTRIE) above.

The earliest documented currency on today's Romanian territory was an 8-gram silver drachma, issued by the city around 480 BC and its coins were widely circulated in the region.

The town was flourishing in the period of Athens's Peloponnesian Wars (431–404 BC) when the Athenian fleet came to the Greek colonies on the Black Sea to collect contributions for the Delian Treasury.

In the early 4th century the city walls were destroyed when the Scythians led by Ateas, who often crossed the Dobrogea area for plunder, were eventually fought off by the Macedonians. The result was Macedonia's domination of the Greek colonies of Dobrogea, and Lysimachus occupied the area after the death of Alexander. Histria suffered significant damage towards the end of the 4th century possibly in the revolt of Pontic Greeks in 313 BC against the Macedonians which failed.

A new temple for a "grand deity", a gymnasium and the theatre were built. Histria became an important supplier of grain for Greece.

In 260 BC Histria was defeated by Byzantion although allied with Kallatis. In the 2nd half of the 3rd century Histria was in constant conflict with the Getae, as shown by inscriptions. Around 200 BC the Getae under their chief Zoltes attacked Histria, calling off the siege only after receiving 5 talents (approx. 30000 drachmas).

Another destruction of the city around 175 BC was most probably wreaked by the Bastarnae passing through after being called upon by Macedonian king Philip V or Perseus to reinforce the army.

Mithridates installed a military garrison in Histria (175–100 BC) which probably caused the third destruction of the city in the Hellenistic period. Staters of Mithridates were minted in Histria.

In 71 BC the Romans under Marcus Terentius Varro Lucullus, the proconsul of Macedonia, occupied the city and the rest of Dobrogea, but did not leave garrisons afterwards.

At the Battle of Histria in c. 62–61 BC the Bastarnae peoples of Scythia Minor defeated the Roman Consul Gaius Antonius Hybrida, Governor of Macedonia.

At the end of the Hellenistic era (before 30 BC), the city was subjugated by the Dacian king Burebista.

=== Roman period ===
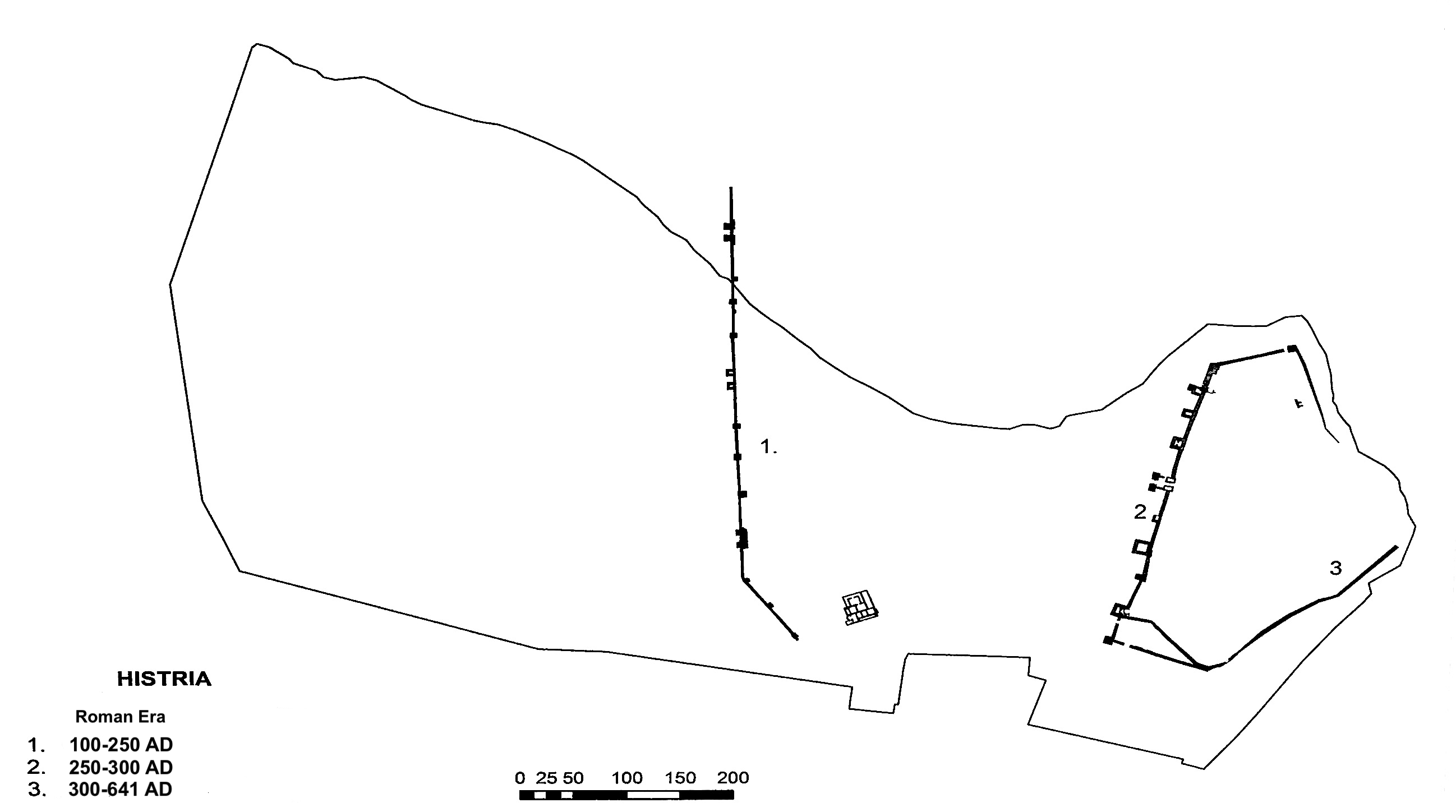
Evolution of Roman walls A=acropolis P=plateau

In 29 BC Histria came under Roman domination when Marcus Licinius Crassus, proconsul of Macedonia, annexed the whole of Dobrogea after his military campaign against the Bastarnae who had crossed the Danube and threatened Roman allies in Thrace. This was part of Augustus's strategy after establishing himself as sole ruler of the Roman state, of advancing the empire's south-eastern European border to the line of the Danube to increase strategic depth between the border and Italy and also to provide a major fluvial supply route between the Roman armies in the region which required the annexation of Moesia.

During the Roman period from the 1st to 3rd centuries AD, a prosperous era began again notable by the construction of a new enclosure wall, new public buildings, including two bathing complexes (Thermae I and II) and temples and laws, as described in inscriptions. In 100 AD the governor of the province of Moesia Inferior, Manius Laberius Maximus, confirmed in a long inscription the Histrian's territorial limits (fines Histrianorum) extending to the Danube Delta, rich in fish, where most of the city's income came from at that time ("almost the only income of your city is from salted fish"). Under Caracalla (r.211-217) Histria appears in several inscriptions, "the most brilliant city of the Histrians", a formula that refers both to the glorious past and to the development of the city from that period.

This prosperity was dramatically interrupted in 238 when the city was razed to the ground by the Carpi (Goths). Histria was again rebuilt, although with a much reduced area of about 6-7 hectares, enclosed by a stronger wall, though Histria managed to preserve its identity as a Greek city. The walls were destroyed again by the Goths in 295 and rebuilt under Diocletian and Constantine I. In the 4th-6th centuries Histria represented an important Christian centre, revealed by archaeology. An episcopal basilica was built in the centre of the city where there were at least five other Christian basilicas.

Halmyris bay was eventually closed by sand deposits and access to the Black Sea gradually was cut but trade continued until the 6th century AD when luxurious town houses were built. The invasion of the Avars and the Slavs in the 7th century AD seems to have entirely destroyed the city and remaining population; the city and its name disappeared.

== The city ==
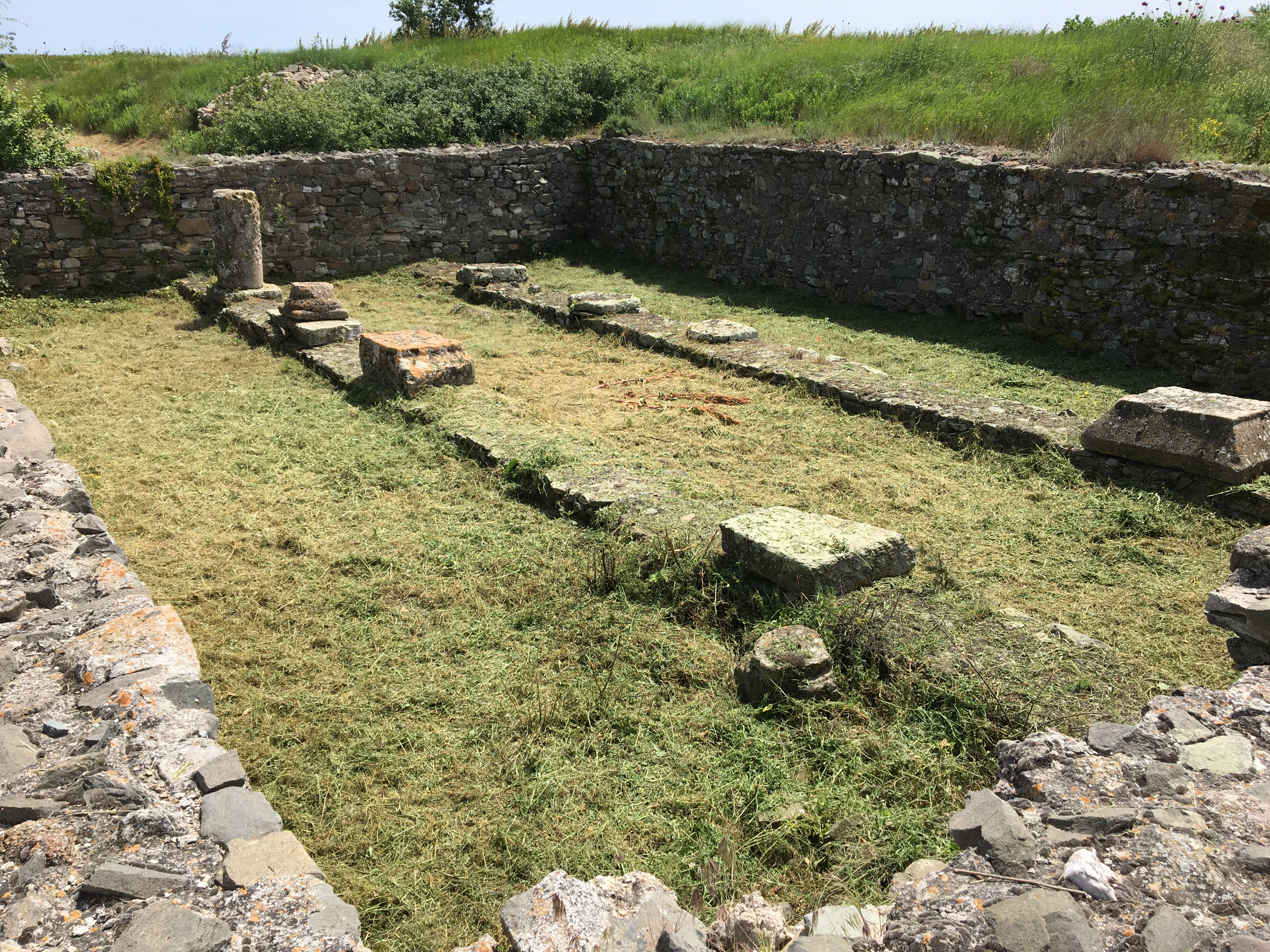
Civil basilica I

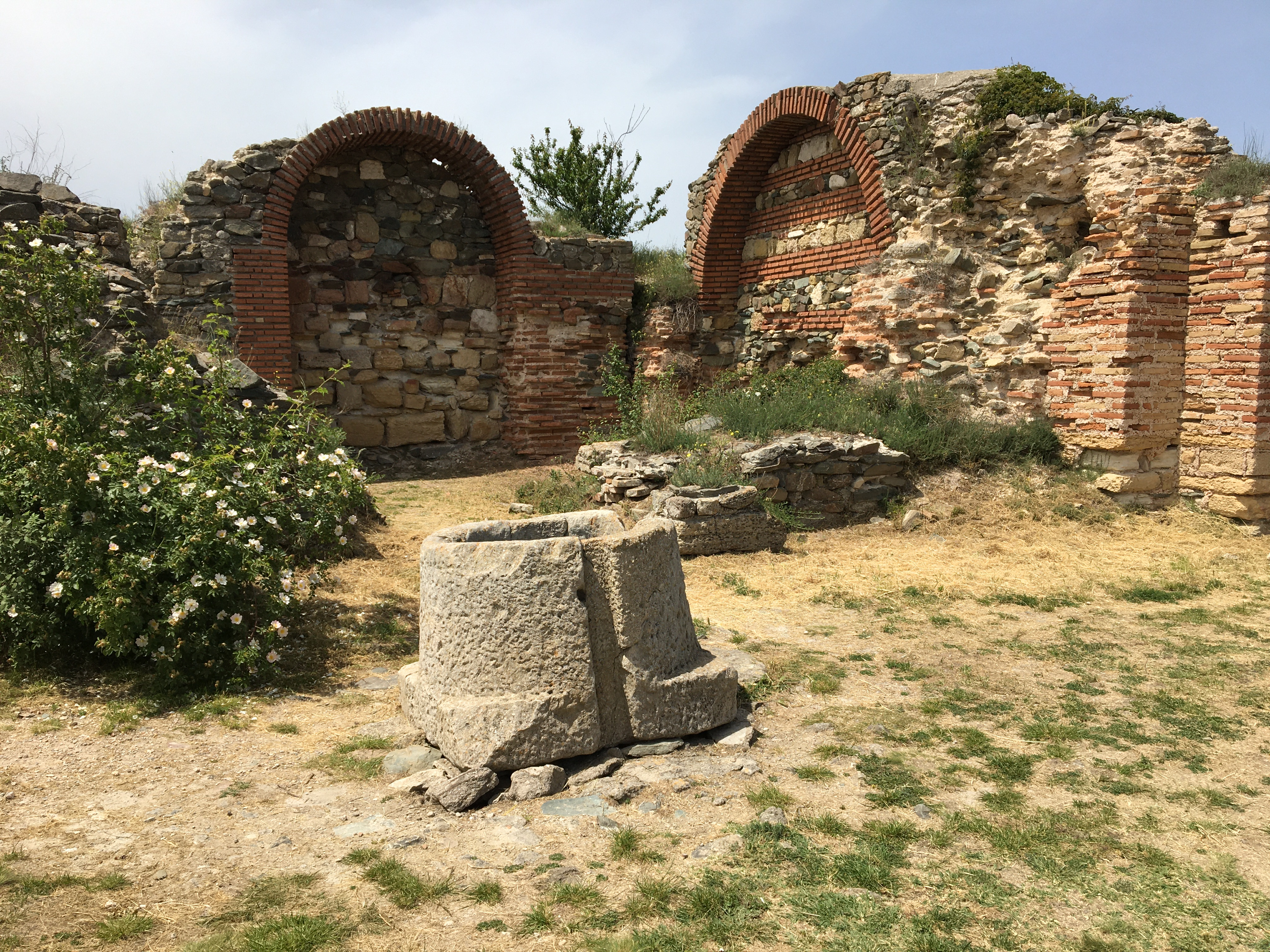
Palaestra of Thermae I

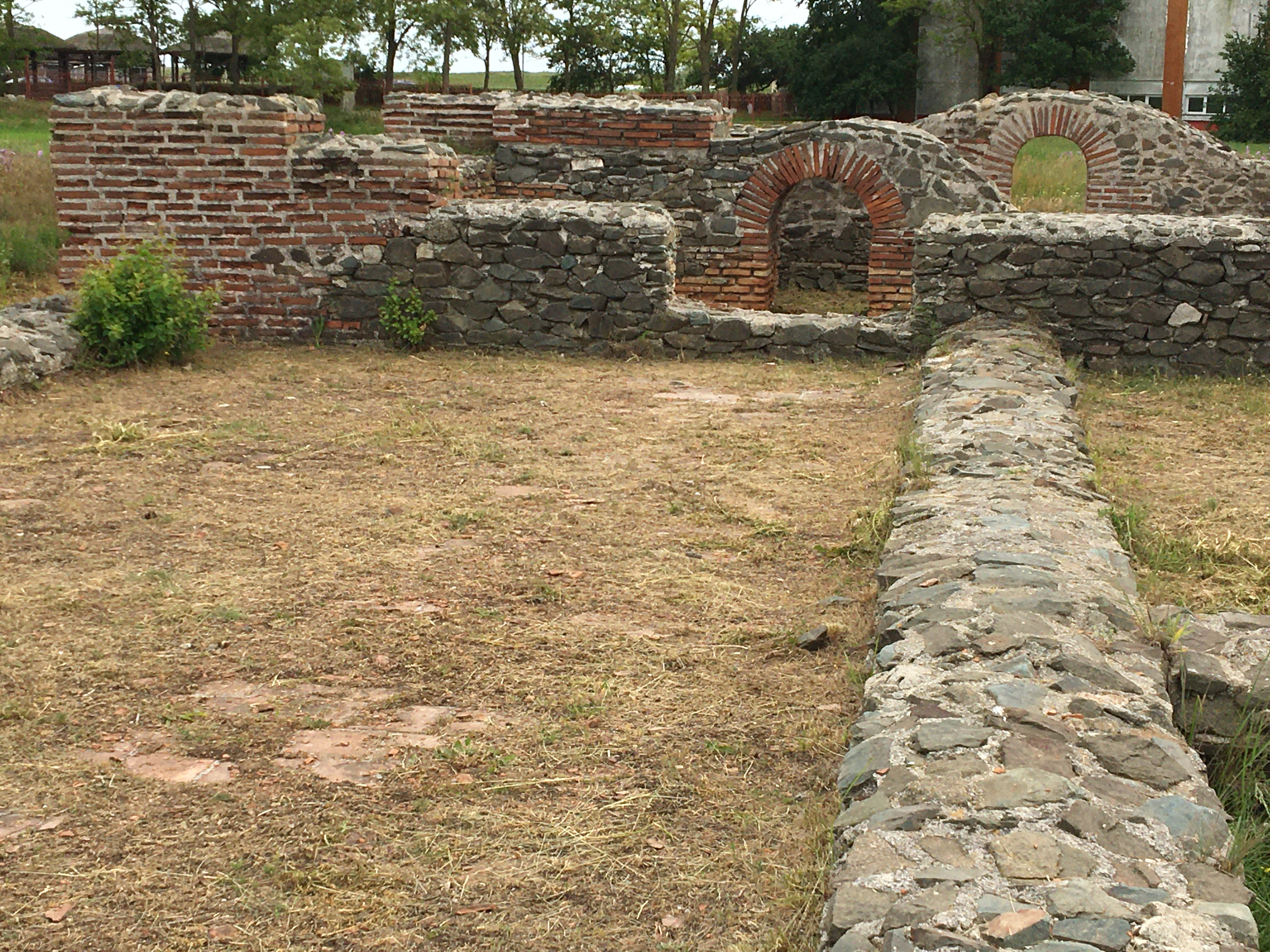
Thermae II

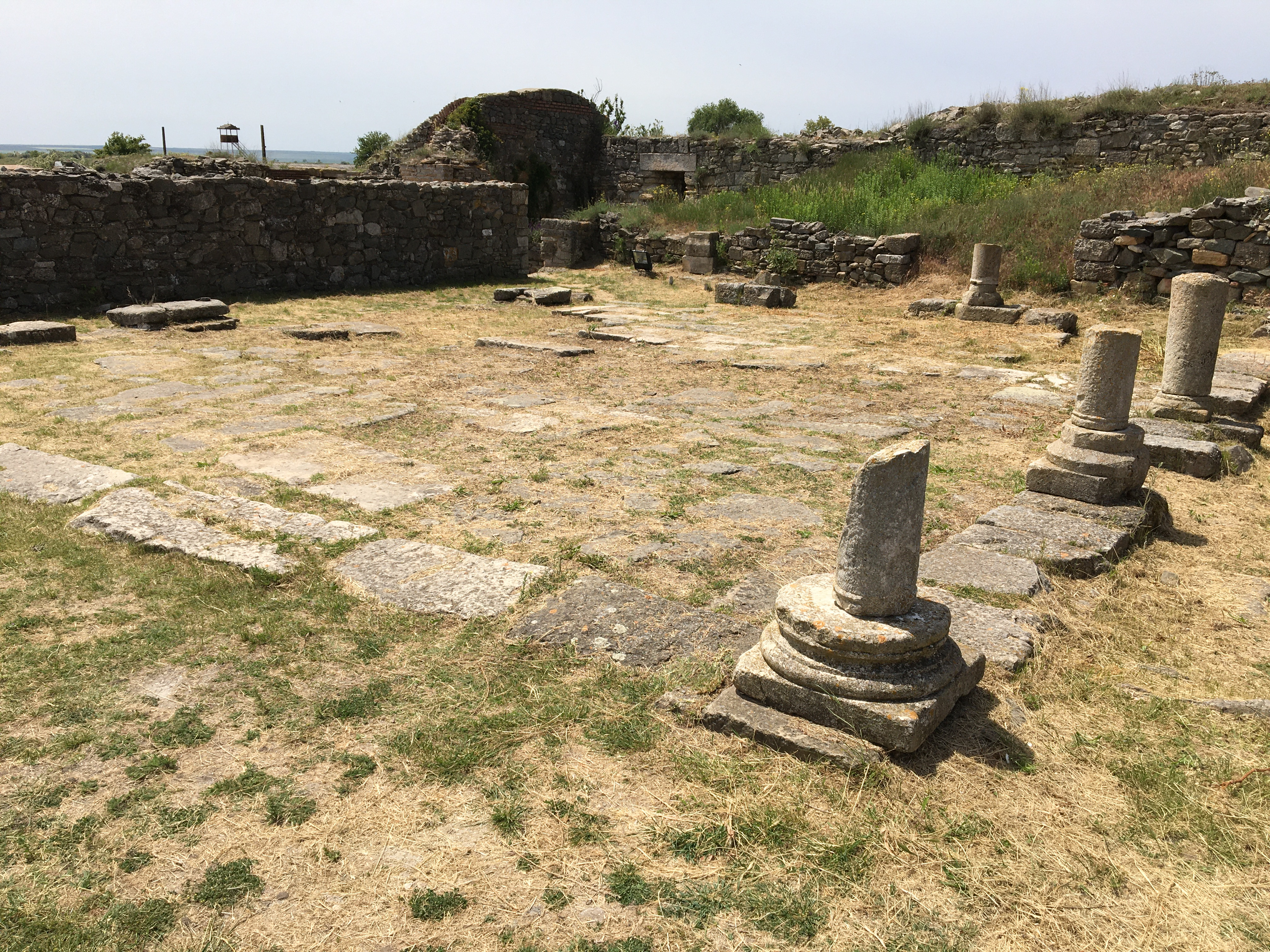
Civil basilica II

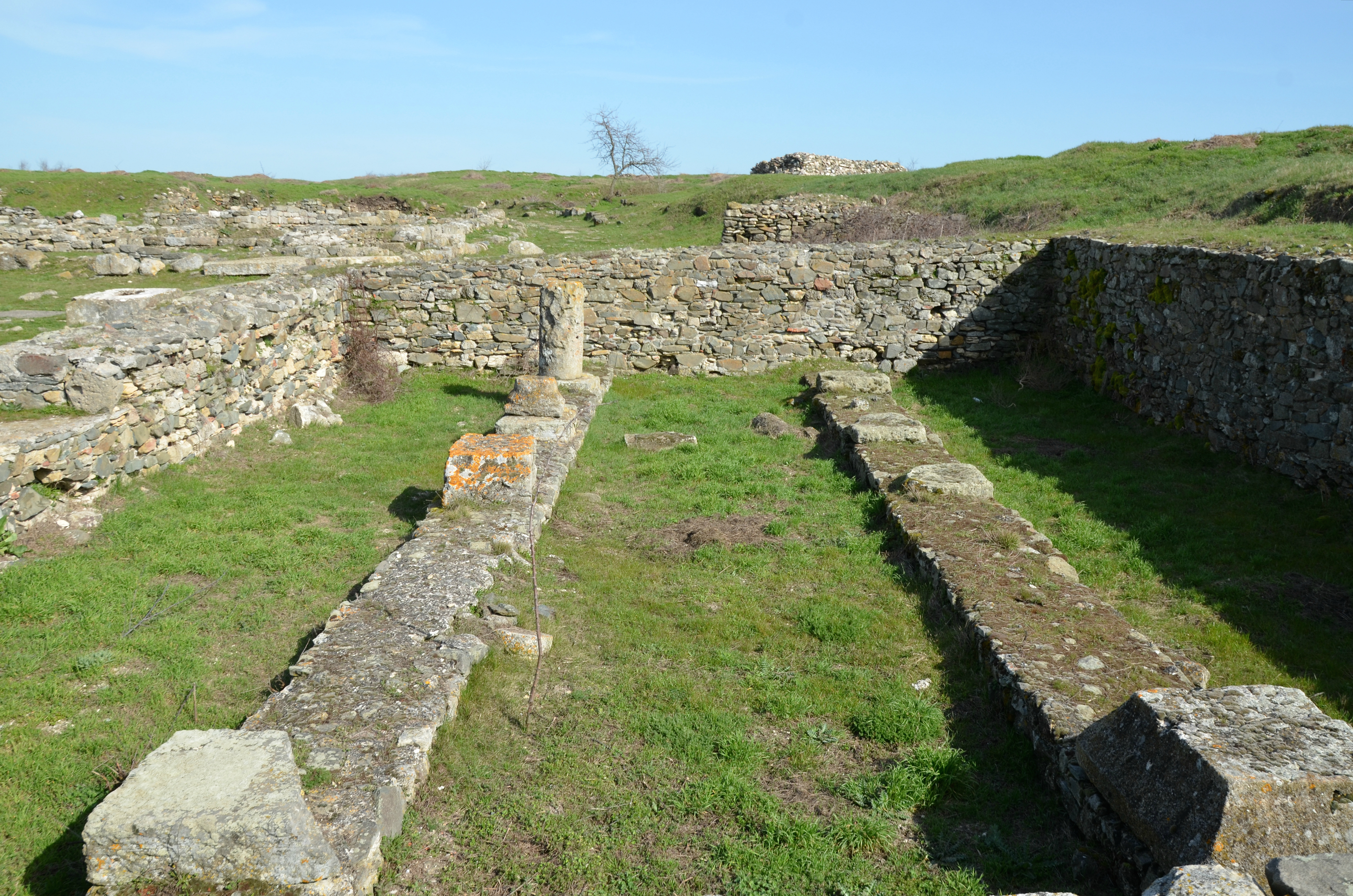
The Christian basilica, 3rd century AD

Like many cities of the time, Greek Histria consisted of two main areas of total area about 80 ha of which more than half was covered by water:

- to the west, on the plateau beyond the harbour, was the civil district of about 60 ha surrounded by the oldest walls from the third quarter of the 6th century BC, a system of double walls of earth on stone plinths and with a wooden superstructure. To the southwest was an artisanal neighbourhood with numerous ovens for ceramic, glass and metal workshops from the 6th c. BC to the end of the Hellenistic era
- the Acropolis, the sacred area with 3 temples and public buildings such as an agora from the 1st half of the 6th c. BC defended by a stone walls, and another sacred area to the south.

Later in the Classical period (5th-4th c. BC) the expansion of the public area of the Acropolis needed a new wall reflecting the transition from an oligarchic to a democratic regime mentioned by Aristotle.

Afterwards, the Hellenistic stone wall marked the contraction of the city due to the beginning of silting of the port.

The baths (Thermae I) were built in the 1st c. AD and in the early 2nd c. were greatly enlarged before their destruction by the Goths in 238. They were reinstated in the 4th century. Water was supplied by a 12.5 mile (20 km)-long Roman aqueduct. The large Roman baths outside the acropolis walls (Thermae II) were built at the start of the 2nd c. covering 1000 m^{2} and used until the middle of the 3rd c. after which they were used as a private house.

In the early 1st c. AD and again in the 4th c. AD the city wall was rebuilt around the acropolis area. After the 4th c. reconstruction the area near the public baths became occupied by private houses and two civic basilicas, with three aisles divided by two rows of columns, and several shops. The bases for the colonnade supporting the roof of the covered shops are still visible. In front of the shops is a counter preserved to its full height. In the 6th c. this residential district was made up of luxurious town houses with beautiful inner courts (atria) with colonnades surrounded by rooms. They had upper floors as demonstrated by the remains of stone staircases and must have belonged to important officials, including the bishop. In the southern one is a large room with an apse, probably a chapel or an elegant dining room.

=== The Sacred Area ===
The Histrian sanctuary, known as the "Sacred Area", in the northeast corner of the acropolis functioned from the middle of the 7th century BC when a small temple (oikos) was built. The main deity was Apollo Ietros (The Healer). Zeus (Gr. Polieus) was the protector deity of the city.

After the middle of the 6th century BC four temples were built, three of which were of Turonian yellow limestone with roofs decorated with polychrome painted terracotta reliefs. All the temples have the same orientation towards the south, their dimensions being approximately 8x16 m.

In the first half of the 5th century BC the sanctuary was destroyed by fire and three of the temples were rebuilt at the same time, the fourth (Temple M) being abandoned. At the beginning of the Hellenistic era (end of the 4th century) the sanctuary had a new appearance by restoring the old temples and building new ones in the Doric style, as shown by the numerous architectural fragments discovered, such as the facade of the temple of Theos Megas, now on display in the central hall of the museum.

In the middle of the 1st century BC the area was abandoned and a residential sector built on its ruins.

== Archaeology ==
The ruins of the settlement were first identified in 1868 by French archaeologist Ernest Desjardins. Archaeological excavations were started by Vasile Pârvan in 1914, and continued after his death in 1927 by teams of archaeologists led successively by Scarlat and Marcelle Lambrino (1928–1943), Emil Condurachi (1949–1971), Dionisie Pippidi (1971–1989), Petre Alexandrescu (1990–1999), Alexandru Suceveanu (1990–2009), Alexandru Avram and Mircea Angelescu (starting 2010). The Histria Museum, founded in 1982, exhibits some of these finds. The excavation project and site also features prominently in the film The Ister.

=== Human sacrifice evidence ===
In 2021, the article "Of Human Sacrifice and Barbarity: a case study of the Late Archaic Tumulus XVII at Istros" was released. In this article, M. Fowler (2021) presents the evidence found at the Northern Necropolis of the Pontic Greek settlement that supports the claim of human sacrifice being practiced in this area.

== Gallery ==
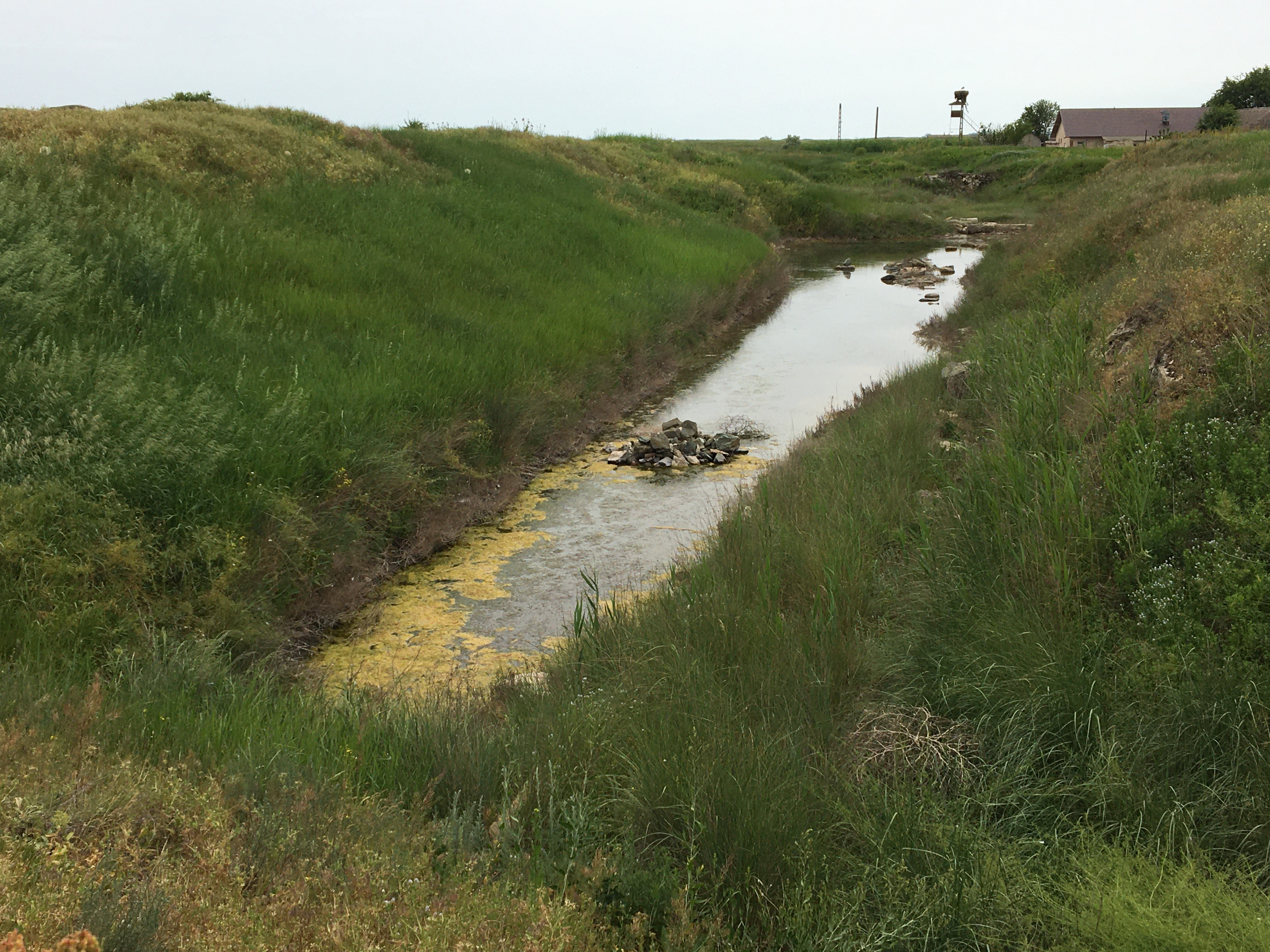
Moat

== See also ==
- Capidava
- Civitas Tropaensium
- Halmyris
- List of ancient towns in Scythia Minor
- Peuce Island
- Tropaeum Traiani
