= Ad Stoma =

Fort in the Roman province of Moesia

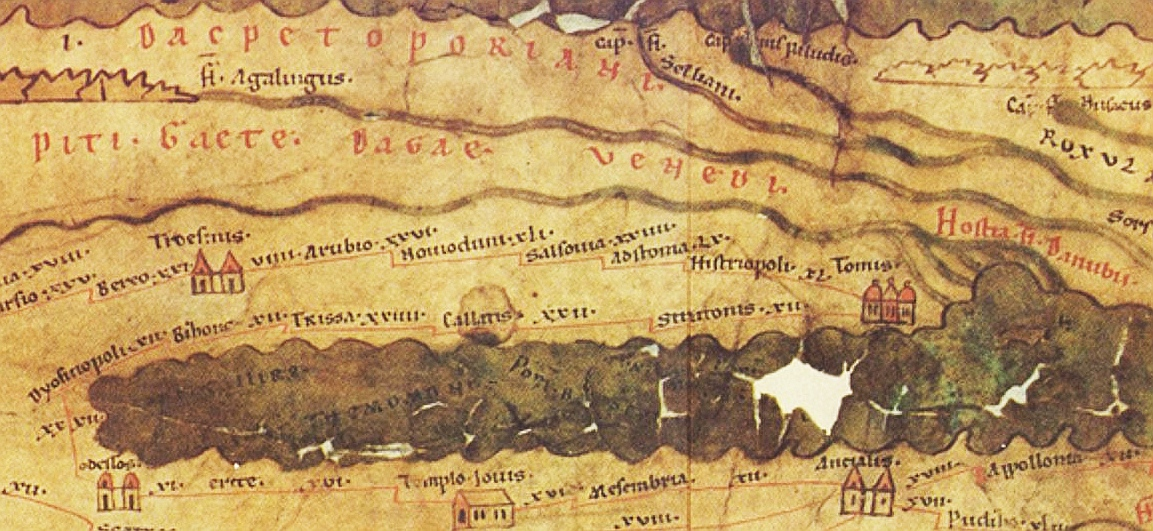
- In Tabula Peutingeriana

- Location within Romania
- 44.8852994°N 28.818813°E
- Location: Enisala ?, Tulcea, Romania

Site notes
- Elevation: 93 m (305 ft)
- Condition: Ruined

Ad Stoma was a fort in the Roman province of Moesia. As the Tabula Peutingeriana shows it is situated between Histriopolis and Salsovia, 60 Roman miles from Histriopolis and 24 miles from Salsovia.

== See also ==
- List of castra
