= Ostrov, Tulcea =

Ostrov
- Commune
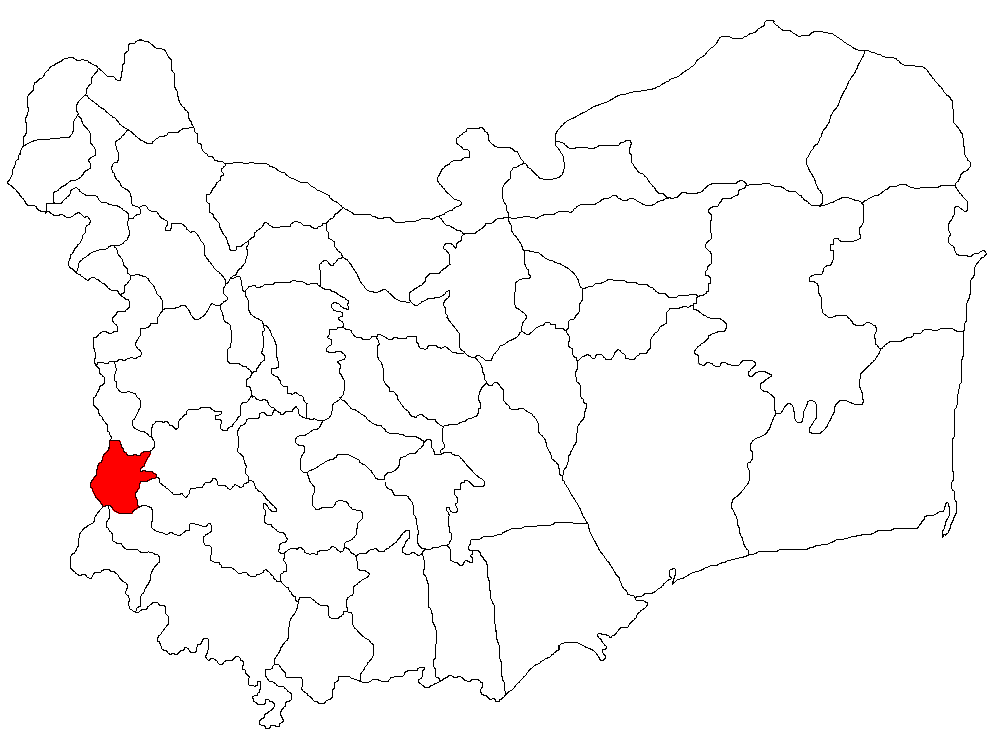
- Location in Tulcea County

- Location in Romania
- Coordinates: 44°56′N 28°09′E
- Country: Romania
- County: Tulcea
- Subdivisions: Ostrov, Piatra

Government
  - Mayor (2020–2024): Ion Tănase (PSD)
- Area: 118.796 km^{2} (45.867 sq mi)
- Population (2021-12-01): 1,764
  - Density: 15/km^{2} (38/sq mi)
- Time zone: EET/EEST (UTC+2/+3)
- Postal code: 827175
- Vehicle reg.: TL
- Website: www.primariaostrovtulcea.ro

Ostrov is a commune in Tulcea County, Northern Dobruja, Romania. It is composed of two villages, Ostrov and Piatra.

It is the site of the Roman fort Beroe in the Roman province of Moesia and part of the defensive frontier system of the Limes Moesiae along the Danube.

The Beroe archaeological site is on the bank of the branch of the Danube River, 3 km south of Ostrov village. The first historical reference related to the fortress dates to the 2 century AD, the fort being inhabited until the early 7 century.

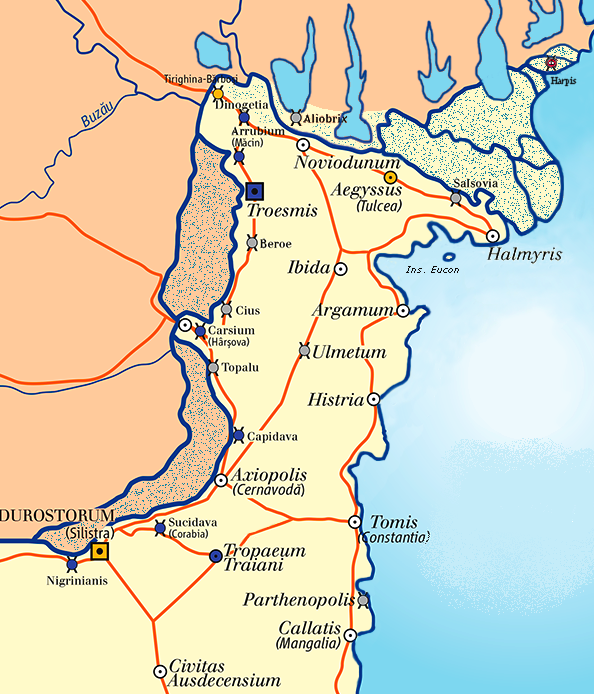
Eastern Moesia and Limes Moesiae

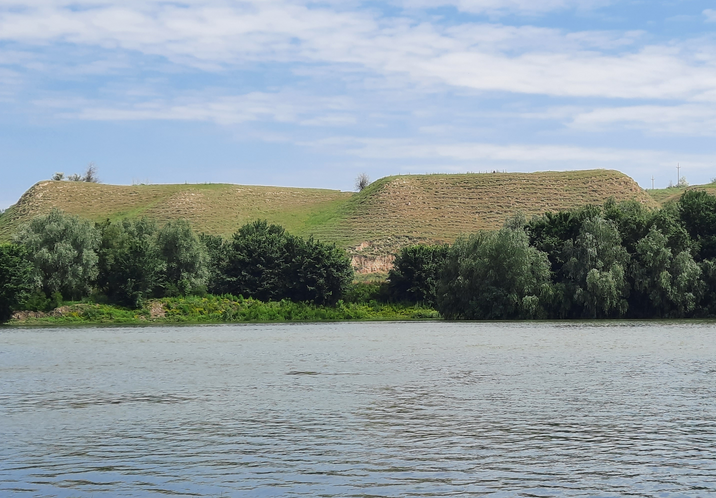
Beroe Roman fort
