= Dinogetia =

Ancient settlement

Castra Dinogetia
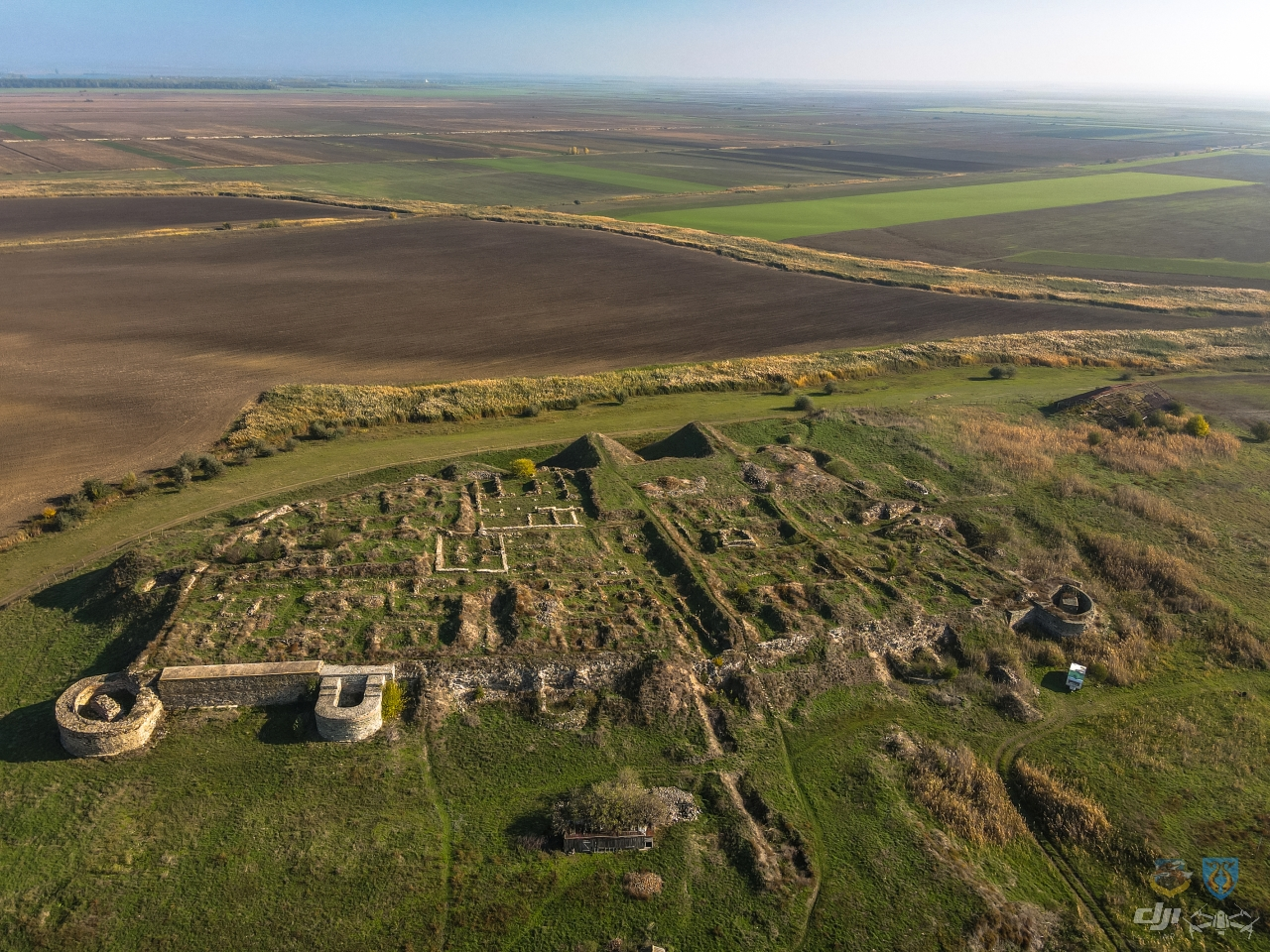

- Location within Romania
- 45°22′44.29″N 28°8′19.64″E
- Location: Garvăn, Tulcea, Romania

History
- Abandoned: end of the 6th century AD

Site notes
- Condition: Ruined

Dinogetia was an ancient Geto-Dacian settlement and later Roman fort located not far from the right (southern) bank of the Danube near the junction of the Siret River. The Dinogetia site is situated in Northern Dobruja, Romania, 8 km east of Galați and 2 km north of Garvăn, a village in Jijila commune.

It was in the Roman province of Moesia (later Scythia Minor) and was part of the defensive frontier system of the Moesian Limes along the Danube, although the Danube now lies 2 km distant.

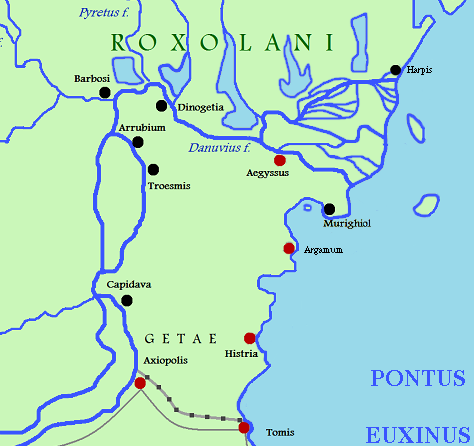
Eastern Moesia around 100 AD

== History ==
=== Roman and Byzantine period ===
The Geto-Dacian settlement was conquered by the Romans and transformed into a frontier fort mentioned by Ptolemy. Located in the centre of an arc made by the Danube the fort had initially been a castellum (a small fortress) playing a role in the Moesian Limes defensive system on the Lower Danube. Nearby Roman forts were Barboşi (Galați County) and Troesmis (Tulcea County).

Numerous ceramic fragments and coins from the 1st-3rd centuries discovered here confirm the existence of an earlier Roman fort at "Bisericuta" but its site has not been identified.

After a period of rebuilding during the Severan period, in the 3rd century Dinogetia was again a target for the barbarian invaders. After the abandonment of the Dacian province by the Romans, its strategic position in the north-western corner of Dobrudja gave the fort an important role in the frontier defensive system. Aurelian, Probus and Diocletian initiated a policy of fortification of the entire Danubian lines, Dinogetia included.

It was largely rebuilt in the time of Diocletian (r. 284–305). In the 4th century several buildings were erected inside the fort including a supposed "praetorium", a basilica, the house ("domus") of an aristocrat. 100 m NE of the site, on the edge of the Lațimea gorge, are the ruins of thermal baths. The citadel, together with the basilica and other buildings within, were rebuilt during the reigns of Anastasius and Justinian.

The garrison included Milites Scythici confirming the archaeological evidence. Other army units that were stationed at Dinogetia include: Legio V Macedonica, Cohors I Cilicum, Cohors II Mattiacorum, cl. fl. Moesica (2nd century), Legio I Iovia (4th century).

In the ecclesiastical sources are registered Christian martyrs dated in the reign of Licinius, especially from the army, thus certifying the Christianisation of the area.

During Late Antiquity Dinogetia had a key role in the defensive system of the Roman province. First Anastasius, then Justinian reinforced the fortress's walls. The attack of the Avars/Kutrigurs under Zabergan's command in 559 had disastrous consequences for the stronghold.

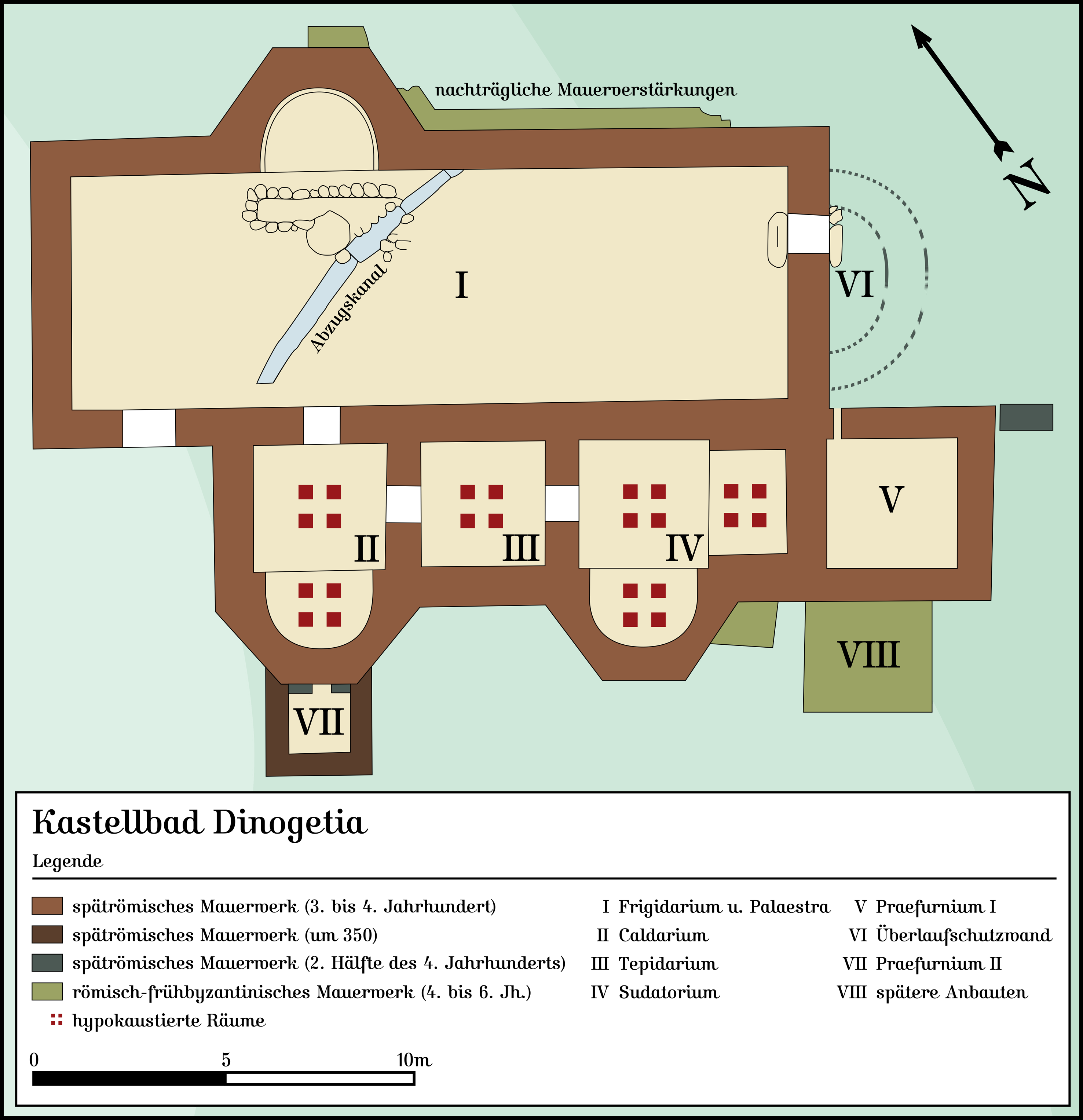
baths

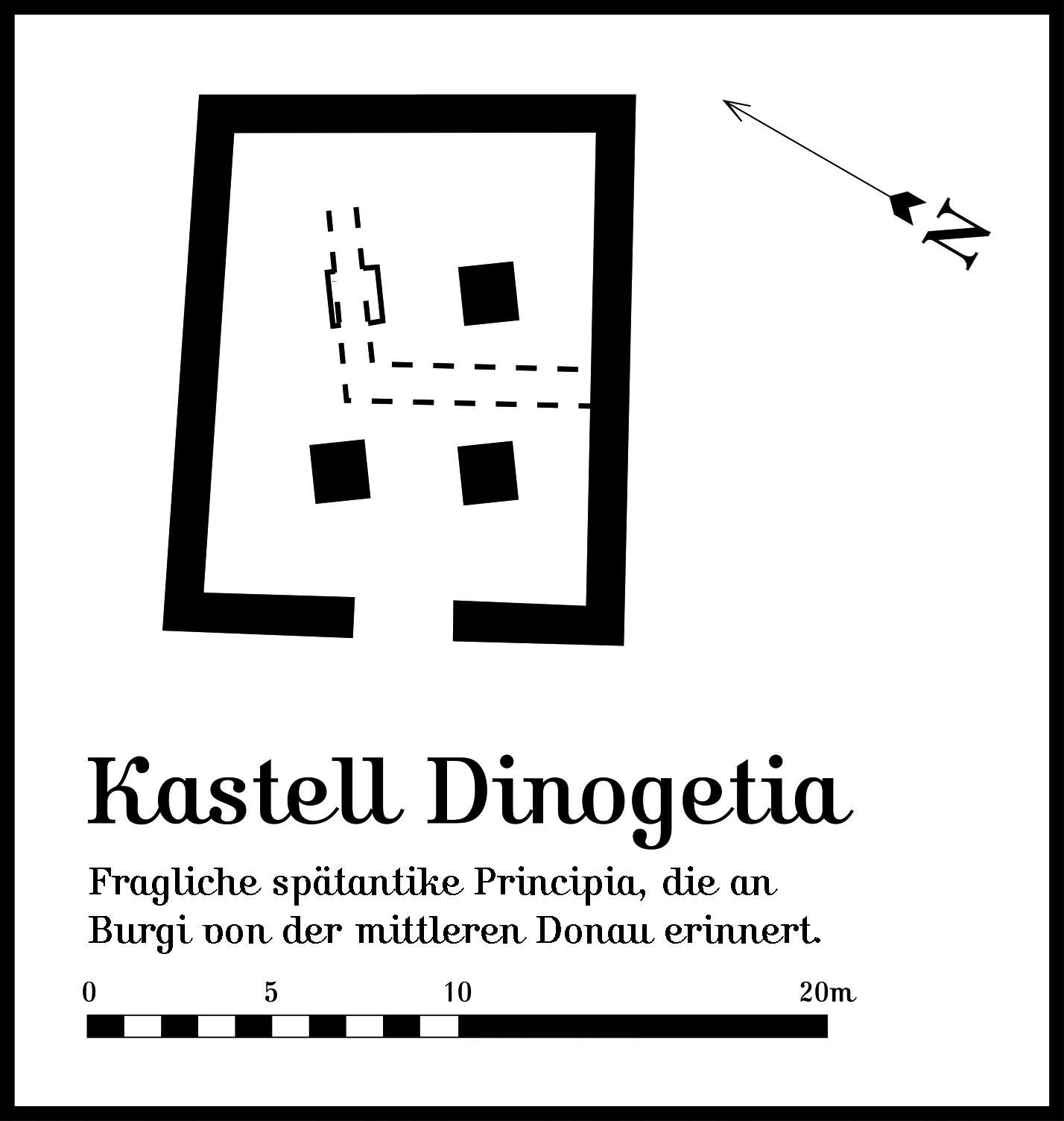
Principia

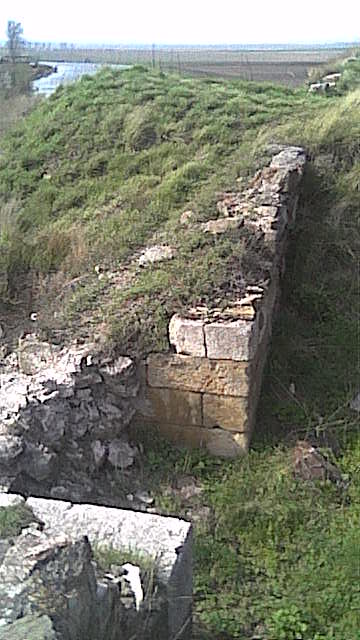
Roman walls and gate

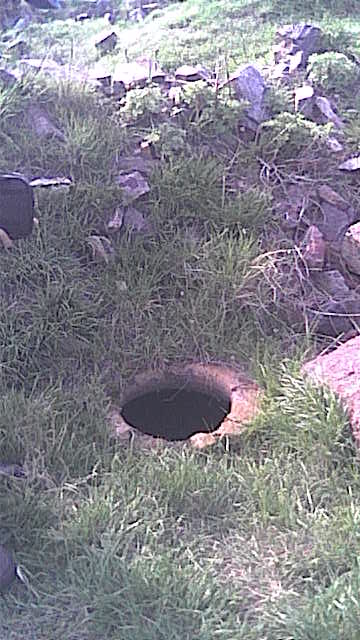
Granary

=== Middle Ages ===
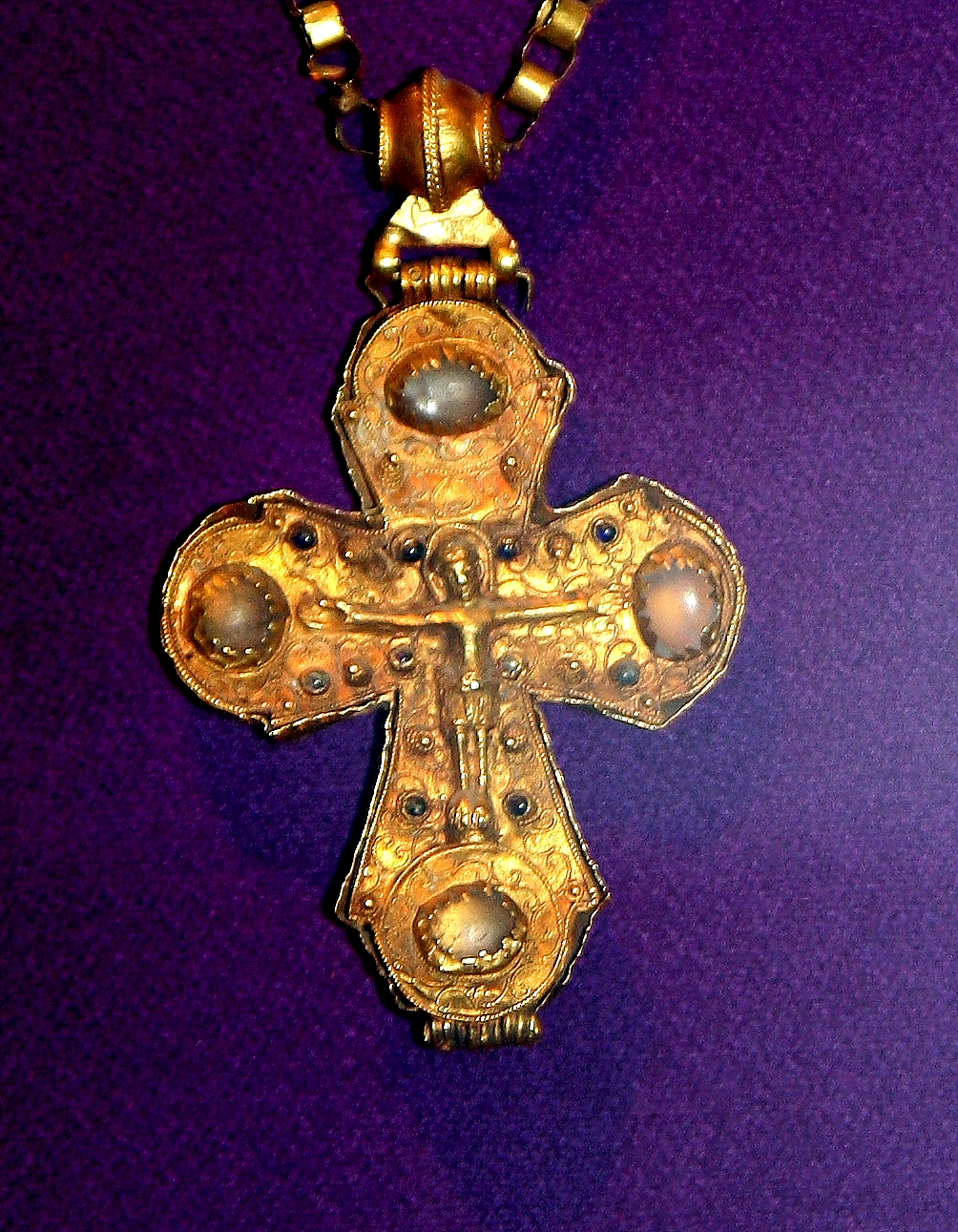
Byzantine crucifix found in Dinogetia church

The fort had been inhabited until the end of the 6th or the beginning of the 7th century when, in the context of Phokas's rebellion, the entire lines of Lower Danube had collapsed under the pressure of Slav tribes. In this context, Dinogetia also was abandoned as a military strongpoint. The fort was rebuilt and became the siege of a Byzantine garrison after the successful campaigns of the emperor Ioannes Tzimiskes (969–976) against the Kievian Russians, when Dobruja was again incorporated to the Empire. The presence of Byzantine troops is certified until the 12th century, when Dinogetia was gradually deserted and finally abandoned perhaps in 1186.

== The site ==
The Diocletian constructed wall (c. 3 m wide) has fourteen horseshoe-shaped towers. Buildings on the Dinogetia Site:

- praetorium
- a large domus
- 4 c basilica
- 4 c Roman bath
- 9 C church

From the Later Roman Empire are bricks stamped with the mark of Legio I Iovia (Scythica) and the presence of Gothic federates.

Written sources, such as Notitia Dignitatum, certify some Milites Scythici (NDOr, XXXIX, 24), thus confirming the archaeological evidence. In the ecclesiastical sources there are registered Christian martyrs dated in the reign of Licinius, especially from the army, thus certifying the Christianization of the area. Other army units that were stationed at Dinogetia include: Legio V Macedonica, Cohors I Cilicum, Cohors II Mattiacorum, cl. fl. Moesica (2nd century), Legio I Iovia (4th century)

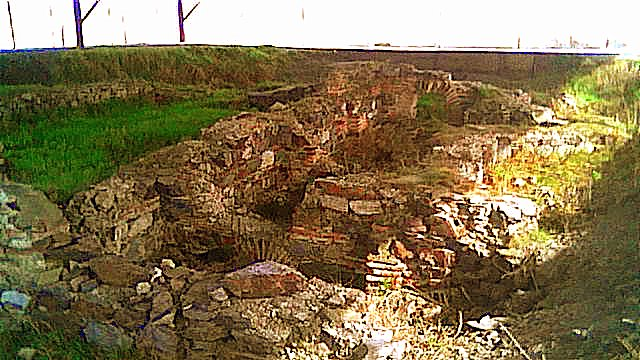
Public Baths

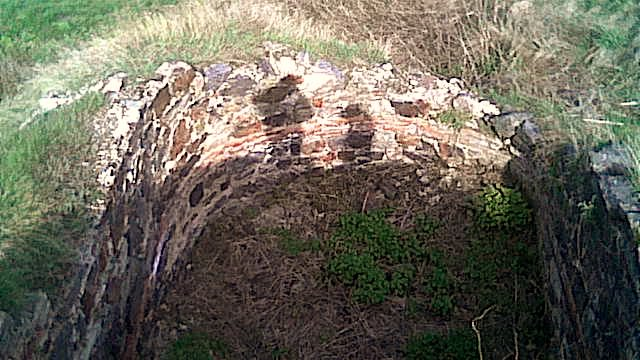
tower

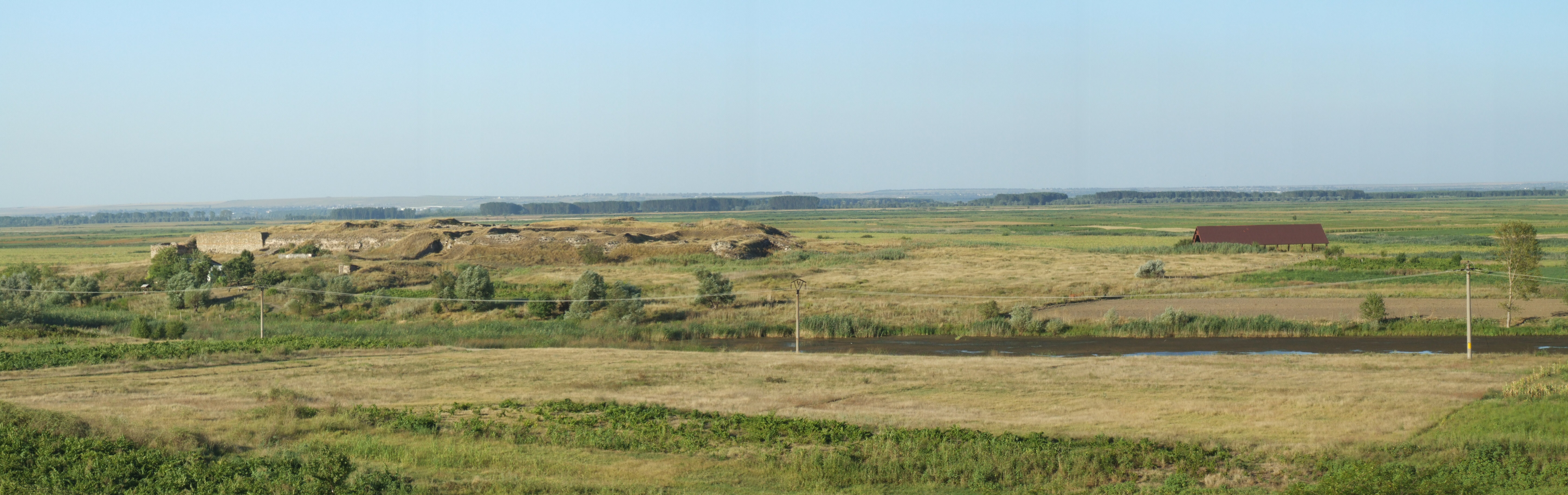
Site Panoramic View

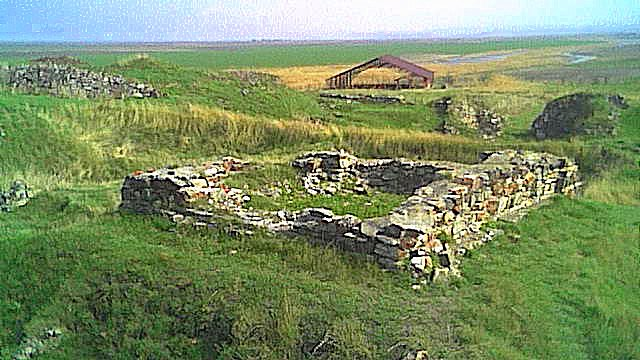
Byzantine Church

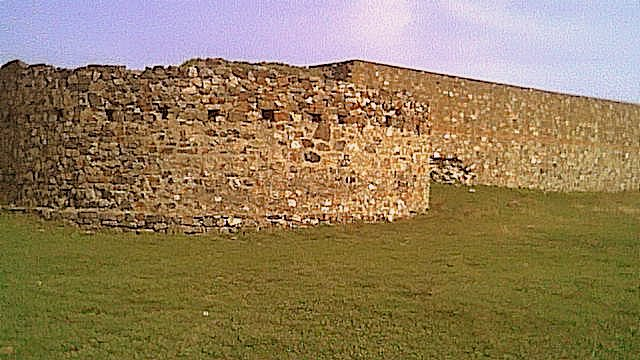
Tower

== See also ==
- STRATEG. Strategii defensive şi politici transfrontaliere. Integrarea spaţiului Dunării de Jos în civilizaţia romană
- Alexandru Barnea Article
- Alexandru Barnea Article
- Alexandru Barnea Article
- Alexandru Barnea Article
- Alexandru Barnea Article
- Alexandru Barnea Article
