= Troesmis =

Human settlement in Romania

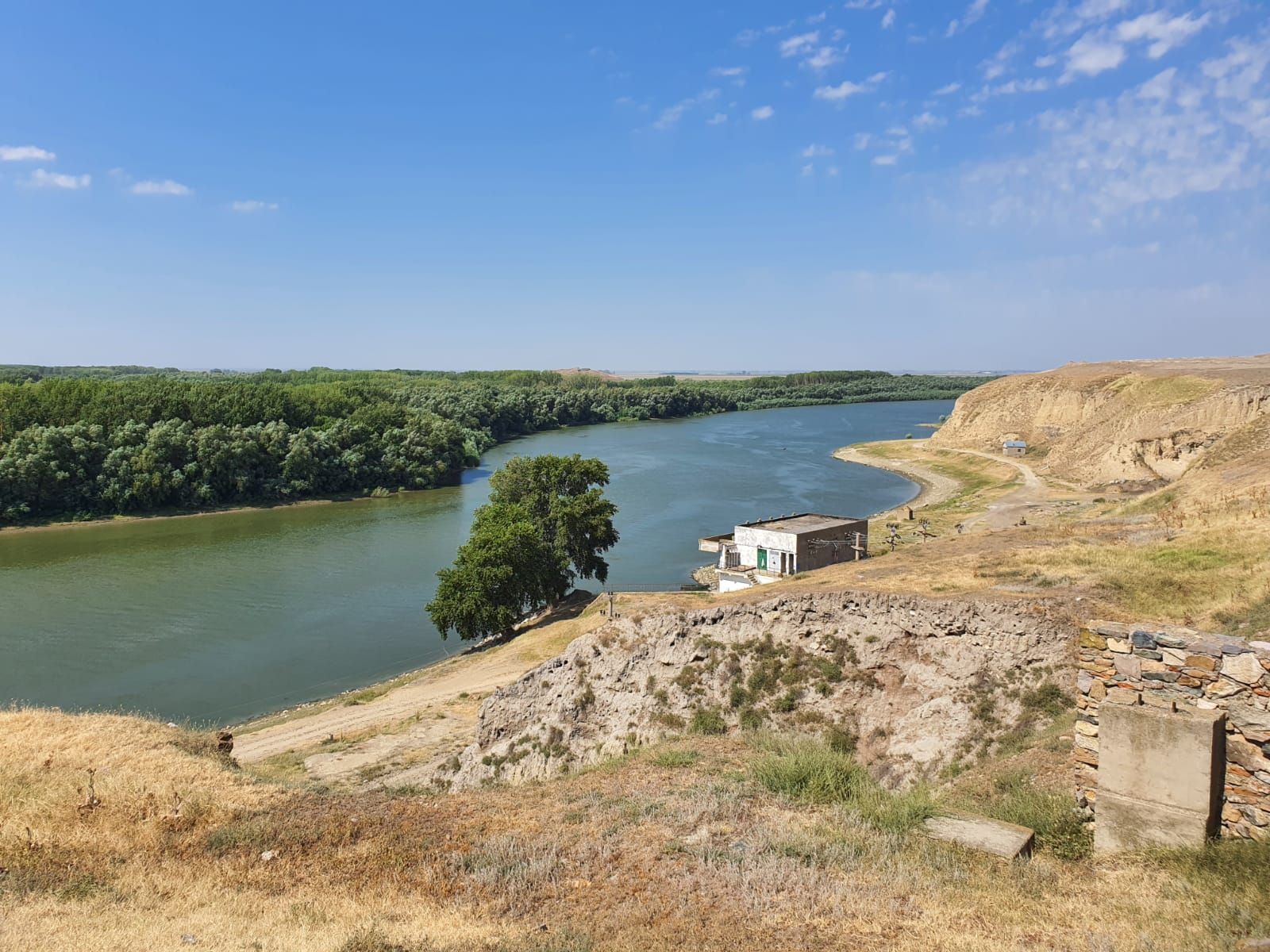
- site

- Location within Romania
- 45.1432°N 28.1951°E
- Location: Turcoaia, Tulcea, Romania

Site notes
- Elevation: 38 m (125 ft)
- Condition: Ruined

Troesmis was an ancient Dacian town and later ancient Roman city and legionary fortress, a major site situated on the Danube and forming a key part of the Limes Moesiae frontier system. Around the fortress the Geto-Dacian town developed.

It is situated in what is now Romania near Igliţa-Turcoaia.

Between 107 and 163 it was the home of the Roman Legio V Macedonica. The Notitia Dignitatum shows that in 337–361 it was the headquarters of Legio II Herculia.

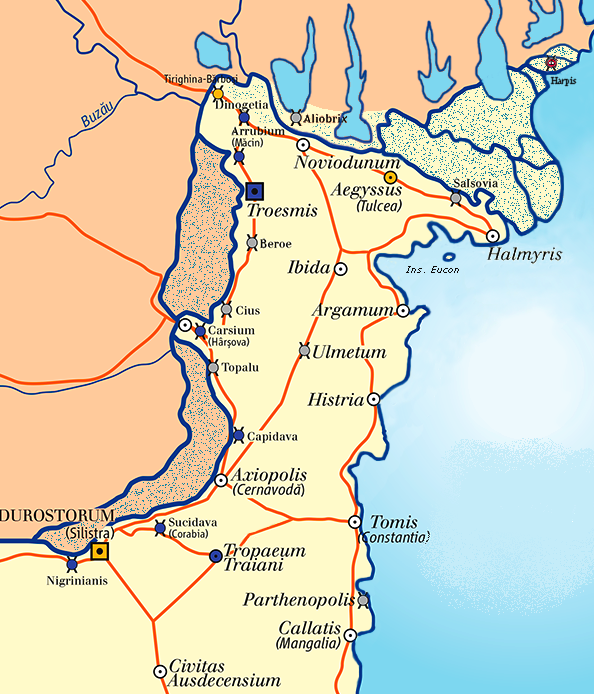
Eastern Moesia and Limes Moesiae

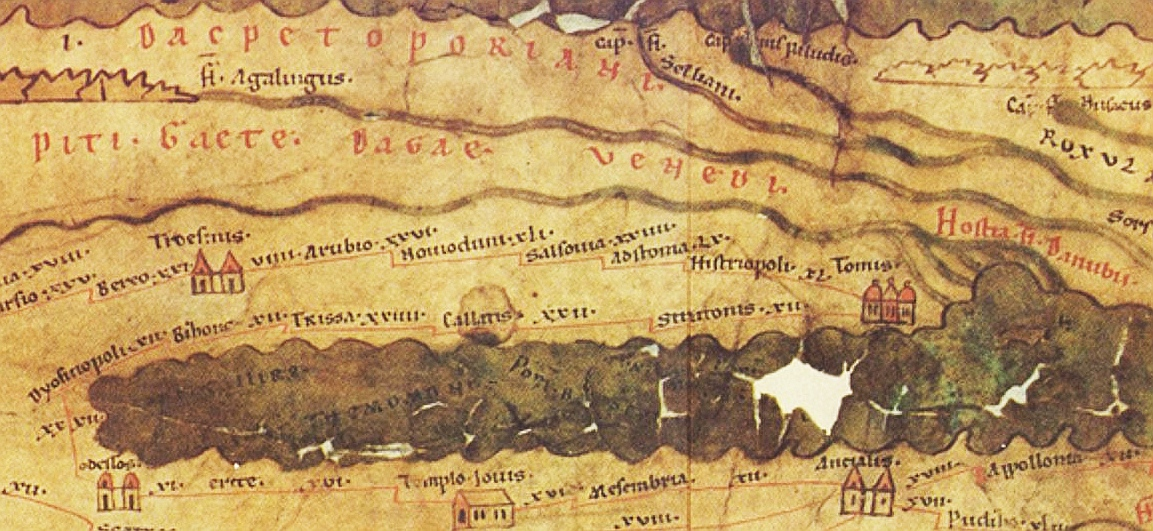
Troesmis on Tabula Peutingeriana

== History ==
The ancient Dacian town of Troesmis was conquered by Lucius Pomponius Flaccus in about 15 AD, re-taken from the Getae and given to the Thracian king Rhescuporis II.

After the conquest of Dacia in Trajan's Dacian Wars, he transferred the Legio V Macedonica from Oescus to Troesmis. Two settlements grew up near the legionary fortress, the canabae and the civil settlement called Troesmis. The legio V Macedonica left Troesmis in the 160s to take part in the Parthian war of Lucius Verus. In about 175 under Marcus Aurelius Troesmis became a municipium.

In the second half of the 3rd century the town was destroyed during the Gothic invasions. The city and fort were rebuilt and under Diocletian (r.284-305) was the legionary fortress of Legio II Herculia and from 337 was also garrisoned by the milites Secundi Constantini. It was also later rebuilt by Justinian I (r.527-565).

It is included in the Itinerarium Antonini as between Beroe Piatra Frecăței and Arrubium which attests the presence of the Roman Legion Legio I Iovia.

=== Destruction of the site ===
The site was concessioned to Desire More by the Ottoman Empire for farming activities. In 1882 Desire More started excavations, and the stones from the ancient site were sold as construction materials in Galați and Brăila. Suspected by the local Muslim villagers that the scope of the excavation is a treasure hunt, a local revolt started. With the help of Engelhardt, the French representative in Danube Commission, armed intervention stopped the revolt. 24 epigraphic inscriptions were sent to France. Four of the inscriptions were published by Theodore Mommsen in 1864.

== The site ==
Excavations have found two walled cities, the eastern of 120 x 145 m with three basilicas from the time of Justinian and defended by exterior towers and by a vallum and a ditch. The western city, only 500 m from the other, is trapezoidal in plan.

The later so-called Eastern (4th century) and the Western (Byzantine) walled cities are today the most prominent monuments at the site. The stone robbing resulted in only the core of the walls remaining and the terrain still shows traces of the extensive stone quarries. The earlier legionary fortress covered most of the plateau which faces the Danube between the two later fortresses in which the later city was built from around 175, and including a municipal infrastructure with a forum, curia, basilica and other secular and sacred buildings.

An aqueduct supplying water to the area has been identified.

== Research ==
From 1861 to 1867, the French government sent a team of archeologists led by Boissiere and Ernest Desjardins to Troesmis. The French team discovered 55 Latin inscriptions referring to the history of Troesmis, Legio V Macedonica and Legio I Italica. The research was continued by Gr. G Tocilescu, who destroyed ancient site walls in order to find and save the inscriptions.

In 2011 new research was started on Troesmis.

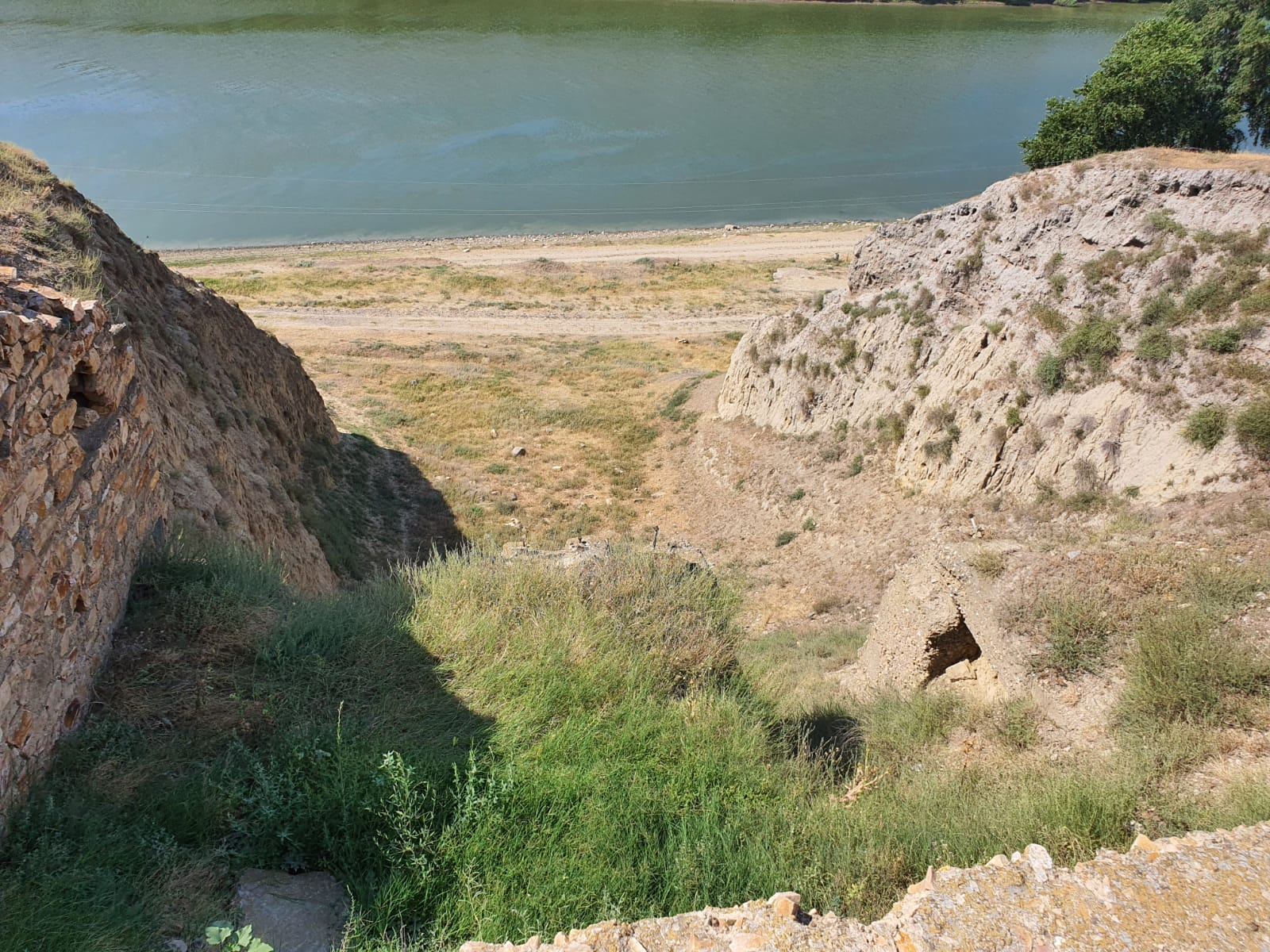

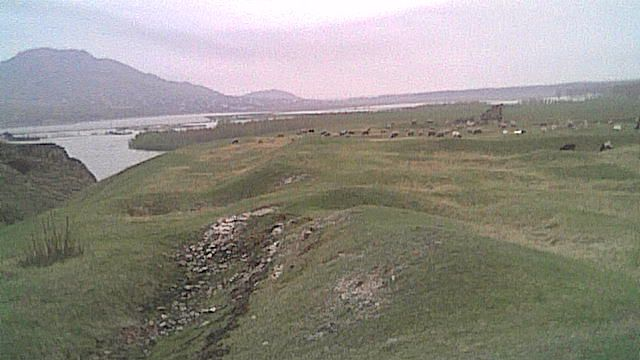

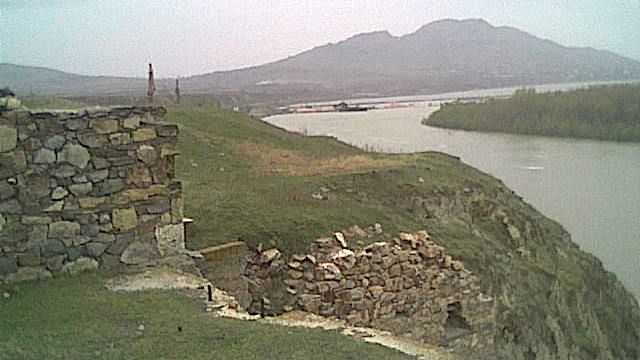
