= Noviodunum ad Istrum =

Noviodunum
- Castra of Isaccea; Noviodunum ad Istrum
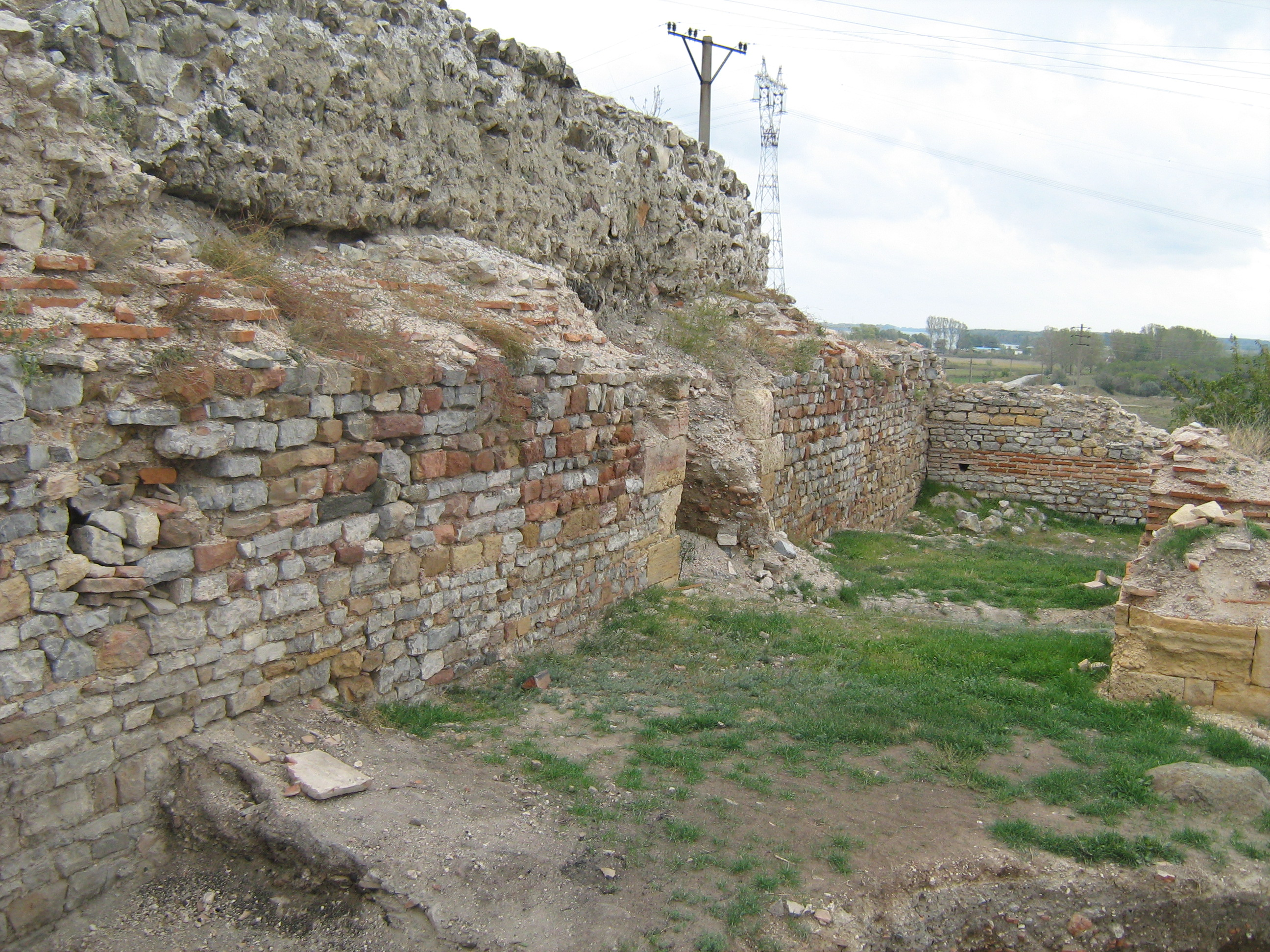
- Wall section of the fort.

- Location within Romania
- 45°16′12″N 28°29′30″E
- Location: La pontonul vechi, Isaccea, Tulcea, Romania

Site notes
- Discovered: 1955
- Condition: Ruined
- Website: www.noviodunum.ro

Noviodunum ad Istrum was a Roman city that developed around the legionary fortress and naval port near the present town of Isaccea. It was in the Roman province of Moesia and was the headquarters of the Roman Danube fleet (Classis Flavia Moesica) located on the lower Danube and, from the 4th century AD, the headquarters of the Legio I Iovia (Scythica).

From 46 AD, the fortress was part of the Moesian Limes frontier defensive system on the Danube. In Late Antiquity, the Imperial Road from Marcianopolis ended here.

The fort of Aliobrix was located on the opposite bank of the Danube, which guarded a ford to Noviodunum.

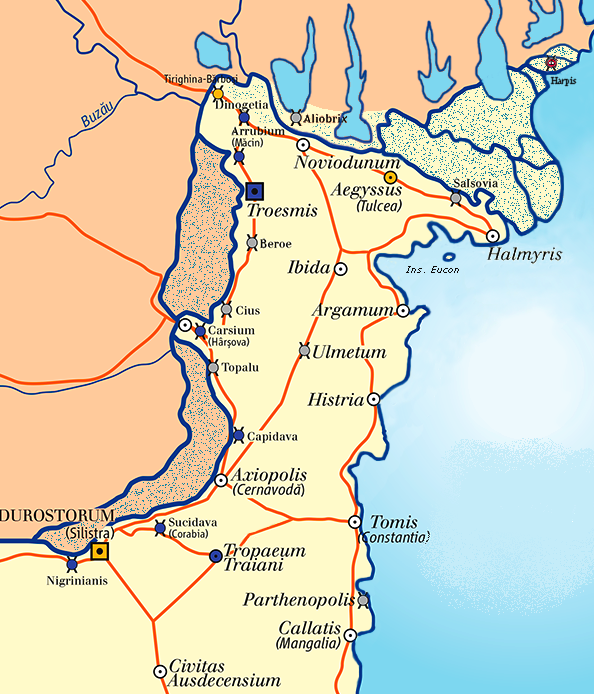
Eastern Moesia and Limes Moesiae

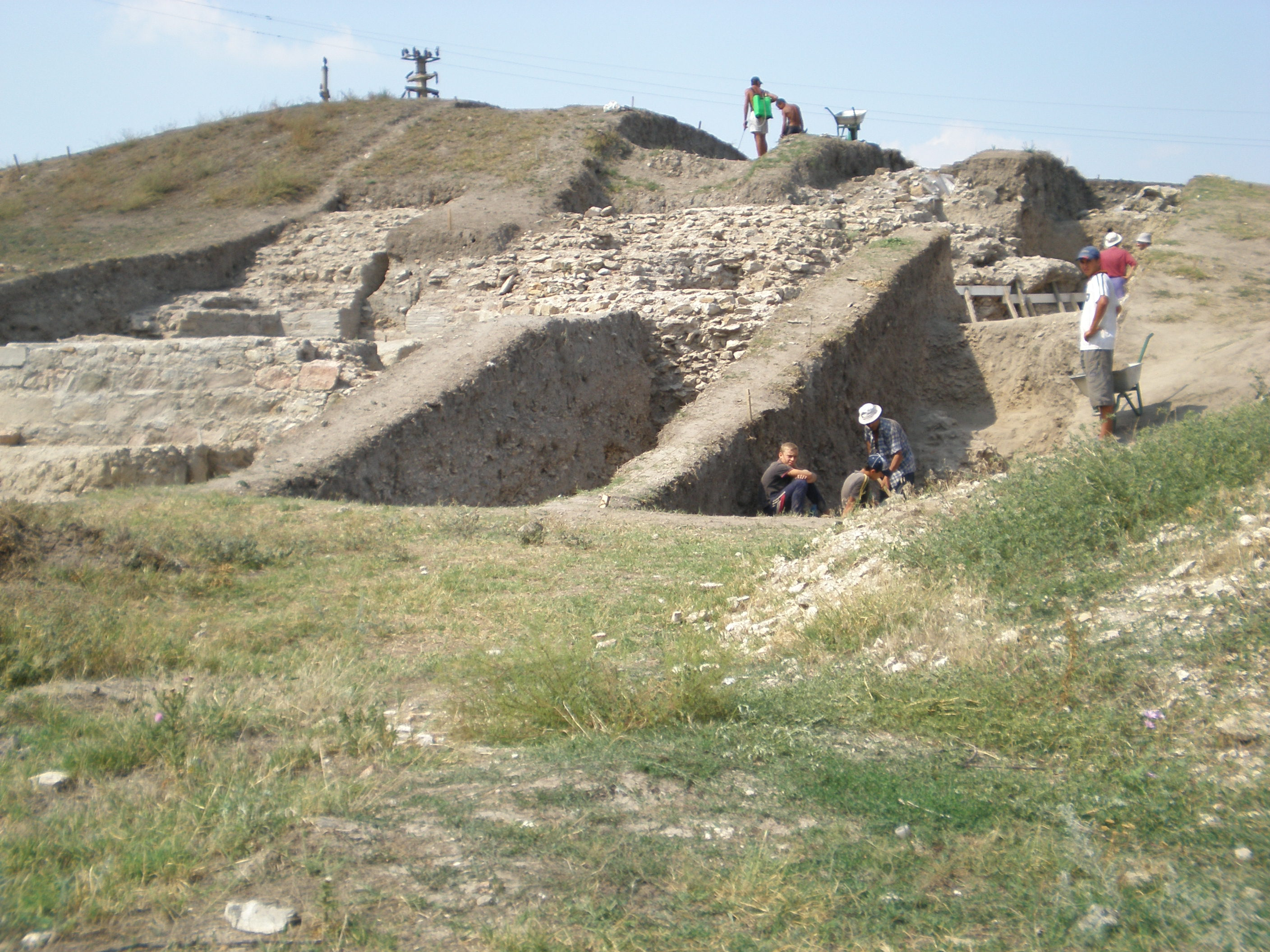
Noviodunum

== History ==
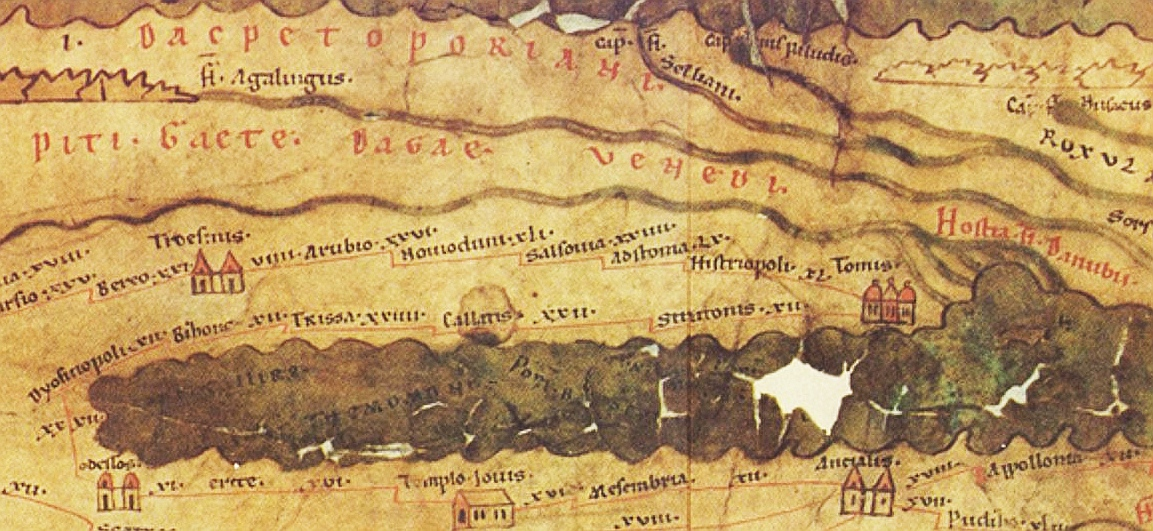
Noviodunum on Tabula Peutingeriana.

Noviodunum passed under Roman control with the annexation of Thrace in 46 AD, being attached to the Roman province of Moesia.

The strategic position of the fort allowed the Romans to supervise and control the border of the entire Moesian Limes along this section of the Danube.

It became the main port of Classis Flavia Moesica and a military centre of the region under Domitian, and after the conquest of Dacia by Trajan. Some vexillationes of Legio V Macedonica were detached here, at least until the reign of Marcus Aurelius. Then followed vexillationes of Legio I Italica.

The civil settlement became a municipium during the late second century.

It was probably destroyed during the second half of the 3rd century during the period of heavy invasions of Goths and Heruli. Under Diocletian (r. 284–305), Legio I Iovia was created and based here.

It was rebuilt during the reign of Constantine the Great (after 324) during the military campaigns and placed under the command of the Dux Scythiae.

In 369 Emperor Valens crossed the Danube from Noviodunum and fought the Battle of Noviodunum against Athanaric and the Tervingi, in which Valens was victorious and took the title Gothicus Maximus.

Between 434 and 441, the city with its naval base was occupied by the Huns, but was then taken back under Roman rule to be part of the Byzantine Empire.

The city survived until the 7th century.

== The site ==
The area enclosed by walls is about 9 ha divided into two distinct enclosures; one is from at least before the 4th century, consisting of the headquarters of the Danube Fleet, and the other is the walled city from the late 2nd century. A second civil settlement of at least 7 ha, depending, on the military garrison would be inside the three huge earth ramparts.

In the 1990s, three towers on the southern curtain wall were revealed; a fan shaped tower on the corner, a U shaped tower and the Large Tower, one of the largest towers ever built by the Romans. These towers connected by the curtain, almost 3 m wide, extend for 80 m.

== See also ==
- List of castra
