= Battle of Noviodunum =

- Part of the Roman–Germanic Wars
Date	369
Location	Noviodunum, Moesia
Result	Roman victory

Belligerents
Roman Empire	Thervingi

Commanders and leaders
Valens	Athanaric

Strength
Unknown	Unknown

Casualties and losses
Unknown	Unknown

The Battle of Noviodunum was fought in 369 between the Roman Empire and the Thervingi at Noviodunum, Moesia, modern-day Romania. At this time, the leader of the Thervingi, Athanaric was threatening northern Greece. Having repulsed the invaders at Daphne, Emperor Valens secured a decisive victory against Athanaric at Noviodunum. In September 369, Athanaric accepted an advantageous treaty with Valens, but peace between the Goths and the Romans would turn short-lived.

A bridge made of ships between Noviodunum and Aliobrix (in modern-day Ukraine) was utilized during the Roman campaign.

== Sources ==
- Jaques, Tony (2007). Dictionary of Battles and Sieges: F-O. Greenwood Publishing Group. ISBN 978-0313335389.
