= Turcoaia =

- Commune
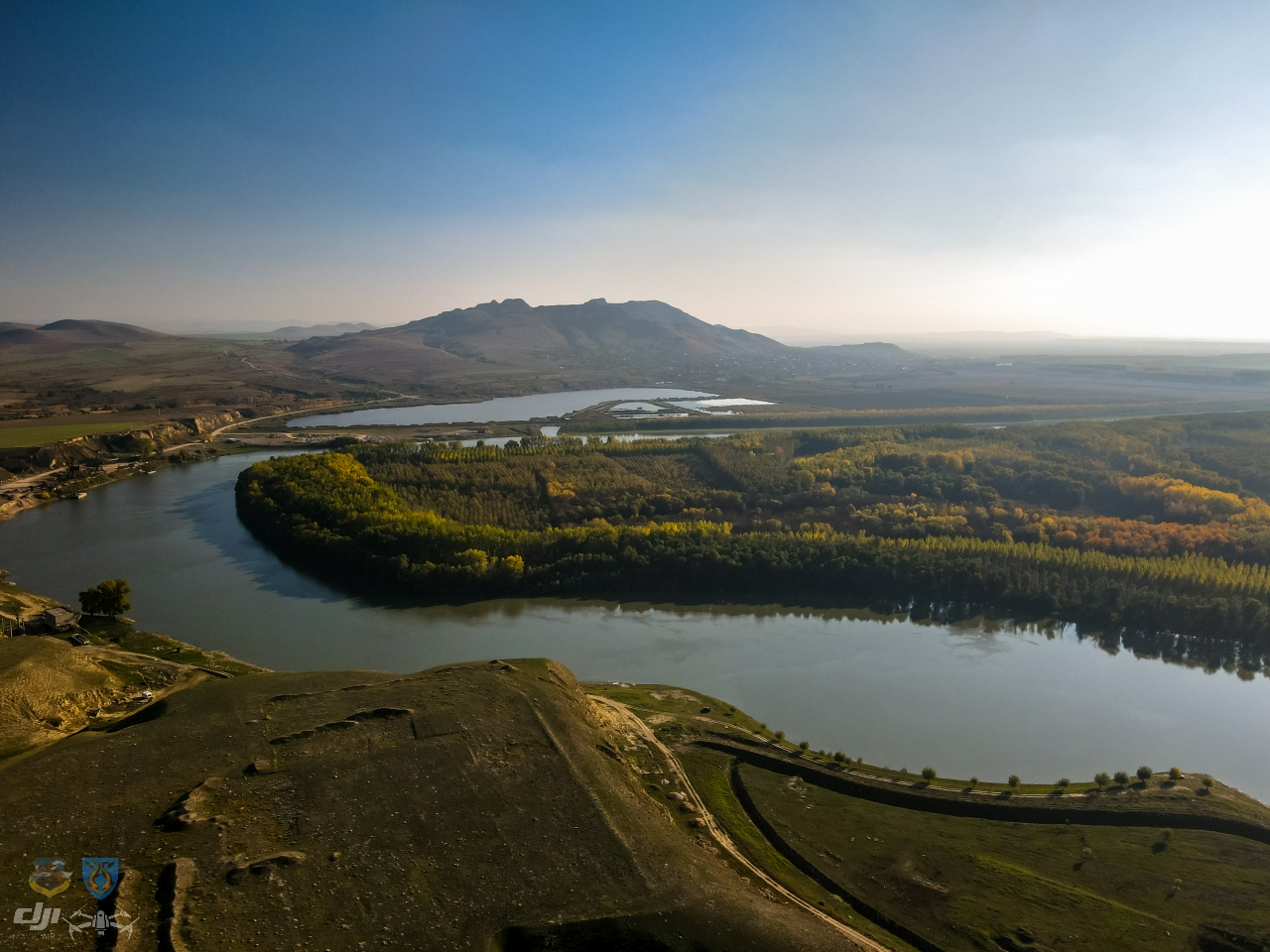
- The Danube near Turcoaia

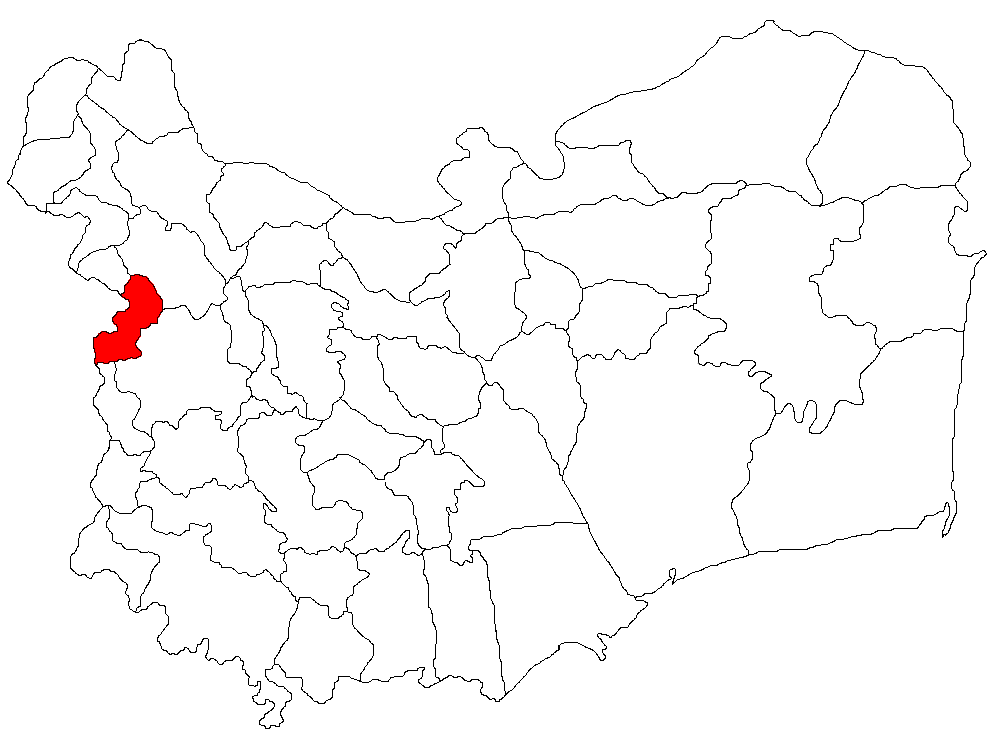
- Location in Tulcea County

- Location in Romania
- Coordinates: 45°07′N 28°11′E
- Country: Romania
- County: Tulcea

Government
  - Mayor (2020–2024): Năstase Sandu (PNL)
- Area: 56.61 km^{2} (21.86 sq mi)
- Elevation: 37 m (121 ft)
- Population (2021-12-01): 2,822
  - Density: 49.85/km^{2} (129.1/sq mi)
- Time zone: UTC+02:00 (EET)
  - Summer (DST): UTC+03:00 (EEST)
- Postal code: 827230
- Area code: +40 x40
- Vehicle reg.: TL
- Website: turcoaia.ro

Turcoaia is a commune in Tulcea County, Northern Dobruja, Romania. It is composed of a single village, Turcoaia.

A village called Iglița used to exist in the area; after being destroyed, its territory was folded into that of Turcoaia.

Historical population
Year	Pop.	±%
2002	3,695	—
2011	3,187	−13.7%
2021	2,822	−11.5%
Source: Census data
