= Legio II Herculia =

Roman legion

Legio II Herculia (devoted to Hercules) was a Roman legion, levied by Emperor Diocletian (284–305), possibly together with I Iovia, to guard the newly created province of Scythia Minor. It was stationed at Capidava. The cognomen of this legion came from Herculius, the attribute of Maximian (Diocletian's colleague) meaning "similar to Hercules".

According to Notitia Dignitatum, at the beginning of the 5th-century, II Herculia was still in its camp on the Danube.

== See also ==
- List of Roman legions

== References and external links ==
- livius.org account
