= Legio V Macedonica =

Roman legion

- Map of the Roman Empire in AD 125, under emperor Hadrian, showing the LEGIO V MACEDONICA, stationed on the river Danube at Troesmis (Romania), in Moesia Inferior province, from AD 107 to 161
- Active: 43 BC to sometime in the 7th century
- Country: Roman Republic, Roman Empire, East Roman Empire
- Type: Roman legion (Marian) later a comitatensis unit
- Role: Infantry assault (some cavalry support)
- Size: Varied over unit lifetime. 5,000–6,000 men during Principate
- Garrison/HQ: Macedonia (30 BC–6); Oescus, Moesia (6–62); Oescus (71–101); Troesmis, Dacia (107–161); Potaissa, Dacia Porolissensis (166–274); Oescus (274–5th century)
- Nicknames: possibly Urbana and/or Gallica (before 31 BC); Macedonica, "Macedonia" (since AD 6); Pia Fidelis, "faithful and loyal", or Pia Constans, "faithful and reliable" (since 185–7); Pia III Fidelis III (under Valerian); Pia VII Fidelis VII (under Gallienus)
- Mascots: Bull and eagle
- Engagements: Battle of Actium (31 BC); Corbulo Parthian campaign (63); First Jewish-Roman War (66–70); Trajan's Dacian Wars (101–106); Verus Parthian campaign (161–166); Muslim conquest of Egypt (639-646) (unknown, evidence point towards the unit's presence during the conquest) vexillationes of the 5th participated in many other campaigns.

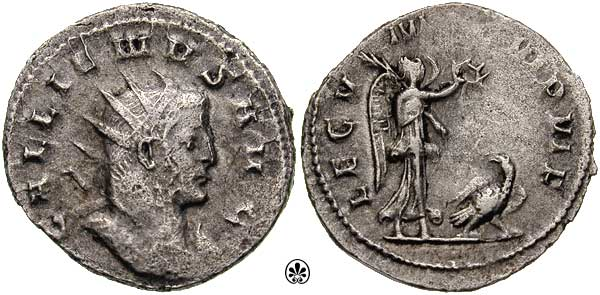
This coin was issued by Roman emperor Gallienus to celebrate the V Macedonica, whose symbol, the eagle, is crowned of wrath by Victoria. The legend on the reverse says LEG V MAC VI P VI F, which means "Legio V Macedonica VI times faithful VI times loyal"

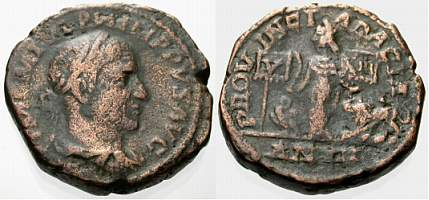
Sestertius minted in 247 by Philip the Arab to celebrate Dacia province and its legions, V Macedonica and XIII Gemina. Note the eagle and the lion, V's and XIII's symbols, in the reverse.

Legio V Macedonica (the Fifth Macedonian Legion) was a Roman legion. It was established in 43 BC by consul Gaius Vibius Pansa Caetronianus and Gaius Julius Caesar Octavianus (later known as the Emperor Augustus), and was based in the Balkan provinces of Macedonia, Moesia and Dacia. In the Notitia Dignitatum records from beginning of the fifth century, the legion was still stationed in Dacia, with detachments stationed in the east and Egypt.

The last known evidence shows the legion, or detachments from it, stationed in Egypt in the seventh century one or two years before the Islamic conquest of Egypt. It is often assumed that the legion fought in this war and was destroyed, although it is uncertain whether detachments or the whole legion were in Egypt, and there is no further evidence of the legion's eventual fate. Regardless, the duration in which the legion is known to have been extant—from 43 BC to at least c. AD 635—makes it one of the longest-serving Roman legions; possibly, the single most long-lived of all.

Its symbol was the bull, but the eagle was used as well.

== History ==
=== 1st century BC: Creation and deployment in Macedonia ===
The Legio V was one of the original twenty-eight legions raised by Octavian. There are two other fifth legions recorded: the V Gallica and the V Urbana. It is possible that these both were early names for the V Macedonica. The legion probably participated in the Battle of Actium (31 BC). It later moved to Macedonia, where it stayed from 30 BC to AD 6, gaining its cognomen, before moving to Oescus (Moesia).

=== 1st century: First Jewish–Roman War ===
It took part in the suppression of rebellion among the Thracians south of the Balkan Range during the establishment of the new province of Moesia in AD 45.

In 62, some vexillationes of the Fifth fought under Lucius Caesennius Paetus in the Nero's Parthian War in Armenia. After the defeat of the Battle of Rhandeia, the whole V Macedonica, together with III Gallica, VI Ferrata, and X Fretensis under the command of Gnaeus Domitius Corbulo, was sent to the east to fight in the conclusion of the war.

The Fifth was probably still in the East when the First Jewish–Roman War in Iudaea Province began in 66. Nero gave the V Macedonica, the X Fretensis and the XV Apollinaris to Titus Flavius Vespasianus to counter the revolt. In 67, in Galilee, the city of Sepphoris surrendered peacefully to the Roman army, and later the V Macedonica conquered Mount Gerizim, the chief sanctuary of the Samaritans. In the Year of the Four Emperors, 68, the legion stayed inactive in Emmaus, where several tombstones of soldiers of the V Macedonica remain. After the proclamation of Vespasian as Emperor and the end of the war under his son Titus, the V Macedonica left Iudaea and returned to Oescus in 71. It took part in the first phase of Domitian's Dacian War in 85-86.

In 96 emperor Hadrian served the legion as an officer (tribunus militum).

=== 2nd century: In Dacia and Near East ===
In 101, the legion moved to Dacia, to fight in Emperor Trajan's campaign against the king Decebalus. After the war ended in 106, the legion was based in Troesmis (modern Iglita), near the Danube Delta. A centurion of the legion, Calventius Viator, rose to prominence and was eventually promoted to commander of the emperor's horse guards, the equites singulares Augusti.

Based on a Roman inscription discovered near Betar, Hadrian removed the V Macedonica from Dacia (present-day Romania) and sent it to Provincia Iudaea, or what is Judea, along with Legio XI Claudia, in order to put down an insurrection that broke out in the 16th year of his reign as Roman Emperor, while Tineius (Tynius) Rufus was governor of the province, and which later became known as the Jewish Revolt under Bar Kokhba.

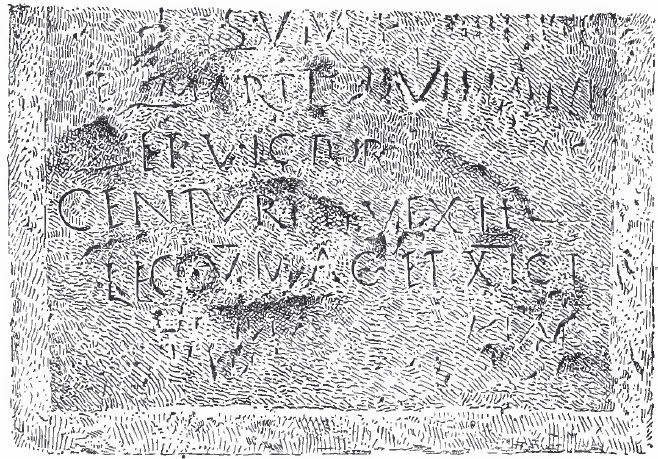
Roman Inscription found near Battir mentioning the 5th and 11th Roman Legions

When Emperor Lucius Verus started his campaign against the Parthians (161–166), the legion moved to the east, but was returned to Dacia Porolissensis in 166 under Marcus Aurelius with its basecamp in Potaissa to defend the Dacian provinces against the Marcomannic attacks and those of the Iazyges and the Quadi.

At the beginning of the reign of Commodus, the V Macedonica and the XIII Gemina once again defeated the Iazyges, under the later usurpers Pescennius Niger and Clodius Albinus. The Fifth later supported Septimius Severus, in his fight for the purple.

In 185 or 187, the legion was awarded of the title Pia Constans ("Faithful and reliable") or Pia Fidelis ("Faithful and loyal"), after defeating a mercenary army in Dacia.

=== Later centuries: Honors and evolution ===
While remaining at Potaissa for most of the 3rd century, V Macedonica fought several times, earning honors. Valerian gave the Fifth the name III Pia III Fidelis; his son, Gallienus gave the legion the title VII Pia VII Fidelis, with the 4th, 5th and 6th titles awarded probably when the legion was used as a mobile cavalry unit against usurpers Ingenuus and Regalianus (260, Moesia). A vexillatio fought against Victorinus (Gaul, 269–271).

The legion returned to Oescus in 274, after Aurelian had retired from Dacia. It guarded the province in later centuries, becoming a comitatensis unit under the Magister Militum per Orientis. It probably became part of the Byzantine army.

The cavalry unit created by Gallienus was definitively detached by Diocletian, and become part of his comitatus. This unit was sent to Mesopotamia, where it successfully fought against the Sassanid Empire in 296, and then to Memphis, where it remained until becoming part of the Byzantine army.

Legio V Macedonica is mentioned again in the Notitia Dignitatum, stationed in Dacia Ripensis, with detachments in the Oriental Field Army and in Egypt.

Legio V Macedonica is again mentioned in both Antaeopolis and Heliopolis in inscriptions, which seem to have been detachments of the units in Memphis. The last inscription provides the date of 635 or 636, indicating that at least part of the Legion was in Egypt until just before the conquest of Egypt by the Arabs began in 637. This would make Legio V Macedonica the longest-lived Roman legion known to history, spanning 680 years from 43 BC to AD 637; the entire history of the Roman Empire in the Classical Era.

== Gallery ==
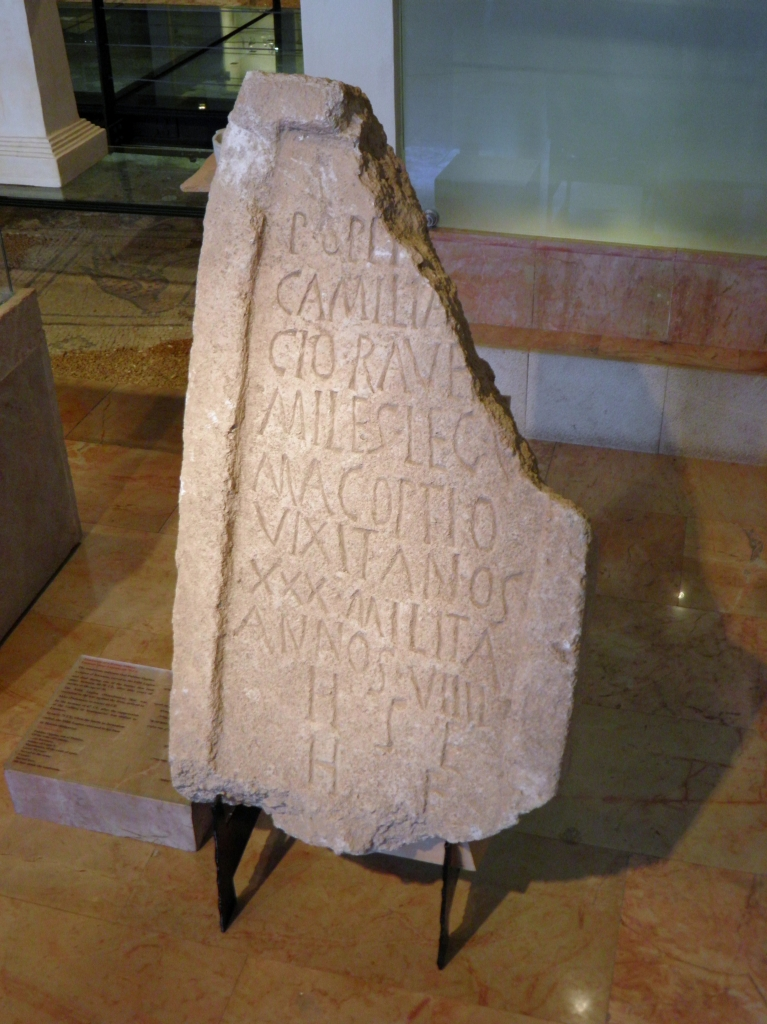
Tombstone of Legio V Macedonica soldier, found near Emmaus. On display at the Hecht Museum, Haifa

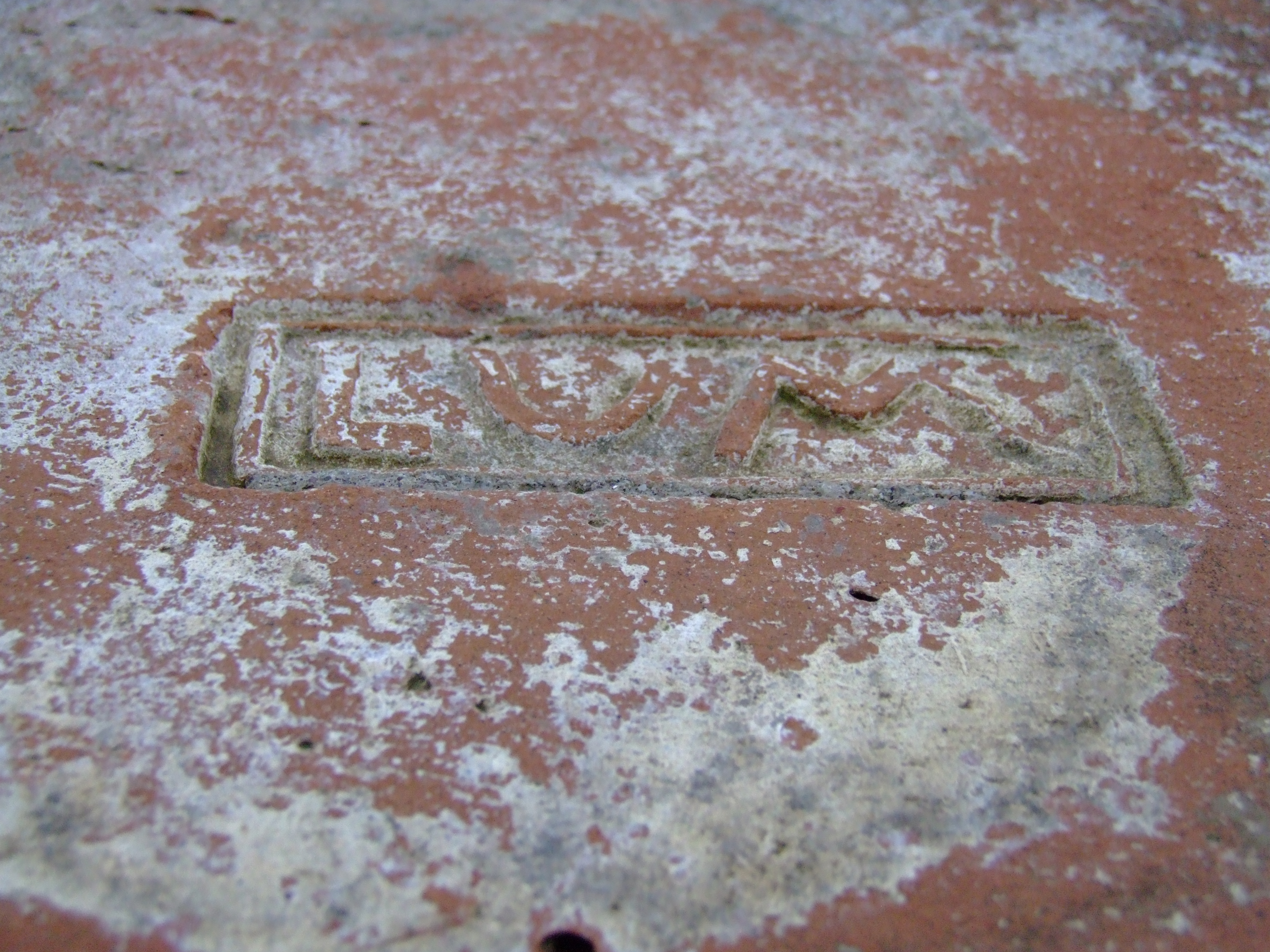
LVM Marked brick in Potaissa

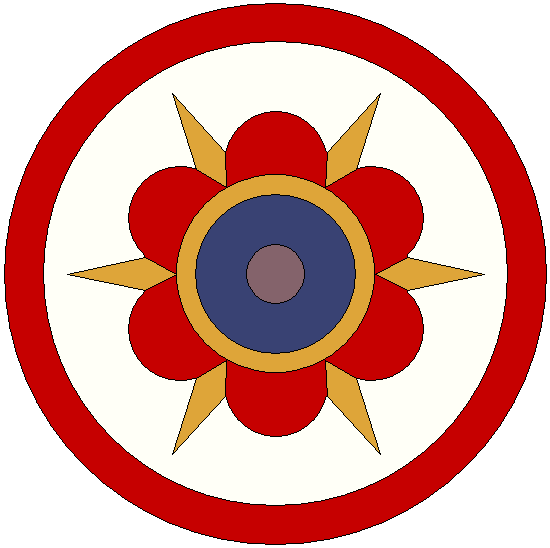
Shield pattern of Legio V Macedonica in the early 5th century as depicted in Notitia Dignitatum, Or. VII

== Attested members ==
Name	Rank	Time frame	Province	Soldier located in	Veteran located in	Source
Atilius Verus	centurio	before 62	Moesia	?	?	AE 1912, 188 = ILB 52
M. Blossius Q. f. Aniensis Pudens	centurio	67–70	Moesia	?	?	CIL VI, 3580 a, b = ILS 2641
Ti. Claudius T. f. Vitalis	centurio	81–85	Moesia	?	?	CIL VI, 3584 = ILS 2656 = IPD 4 794 = IDRE I 3
M. Iulius V(o)ltinia	centurio	between 85 and 95	Moesia Inferior	?	?	CIL III, 7397
Resius Albanus	centurio	reign of Tiberius?	Moesia	?	?	AE 1927, 51 = ILB 47
L. Lepidius L. f. An(iensi) Proculus	centurio	67–70	Italia	Ariminum	?	CIL III, 12411
Valerius Crispus	centurio	between 71 and 101	Moesia Inferior	?	?	E. Peeva, N. Sharankov, Archaeologia Bulgarica 10, 2006, 1, pp. 25–33, A-C
L. Valerius L. f. Proculus	centurio	between 85 and 95	Moesia Inferior	?	?	CIL III, 12411
Pollio	centurio	67–71	Moesia	?	?	CIL III, 14155
Stiminius	centurio	67–71	Moesia	?	?	CIL III, 14155
Lucius Artorius Castus	centurio, primipilus	before 185	Moesia Inferior	?	Pituntium (Dalmatia)	CIL III, 1919; CIL III, 14224
Annius Vinicianus	legatus legionis	63	Armenia	?	?	Tacitus, Annales, XV.28
Sex. Vettulenus Cerialis	legatus legionis	67-70	Judea	?	?	Flavius Josephus, BJ III, 7, 32; VI, 4, 3
Quintus Pompeius Falco	legatus legionis	c. 101-102		?	?	CIL III, 12117
Titus Calestrius Tiro Orbius Speratus	legatus legionis	between 105 and 110	Moesia Inferior	?	?	AE 1965, 320
Marcus Cominius Secundus	legatus legionis	c. 141 - c. 144		?	?	
Marcus Sedatius Severianus	legatus legionis	c. 144 – c. 147		?	?	AE 1913, 55 = ILS 9487; AE 1933, 249
Quintus Caecilius Redditus	legatus legionis	c. 152		?	?	AE 1957, 266
Aelius Optatus	legatus legionis	c. 156 – c. 159		?	?	AE 1960, 337
Publius Vigellius Saturninus	legatus legionis	c. 159 – c. 162		?	?	CIL III, 775 = CIL III, 6183 = ILS 1116
Publius Martius Verus	legatus legionis	c. 162–166	Cappadocia	?	?	CIL III, 6169
Marcus Valerius Maximianus	legatus legionis	180		?	?	AE 1956, 124
Tiberius Claudius Claudianus	legatus legionis	between 194 and 196		?	?	CIL III, 905, CIL VIII, 5349
Domitius Antigonius	legatus legionis	c. 222		?	?	AE 1966, 262
P(ublius) Oppiu[s]?	optio	c. 69-c.70	Judea?	?	Emmaus	
L. Praecilius Clemens Iulianus	praefectus castrorum	36–43	Moesia	?	?	CIL III, 8753
C. Baebius Atticus	primipilus	reign of Claudius	Moesia	?	?	CIL V, 1838; 1839 = ILS 1349
T. Pontinius	primipilus	reign of Claudius?	Moesia	?	?	CIL XI, 4368
L. Praecilius Clemens Iulianus	primipilus	between 36 and 43	Moesia	?	?	CIL III, 8753
[A]prenas Clemens	tribunus angusticlavius	?	Moesia Inferior	?	?	CIL XI, 4119 (Narnia, Regio VI)
L. Clodius P. f. Cla(udia) Ingenuus	tribunus angusticlavius	reign of Vespasian or Domitian	Moesia	?	?	CIL VI, 37274
C. Nonius C. f. Vel(ina) Flaccus	tribunus angusticlavius	reign of Vespasian?	Moesia	?	?	AE 1975, 353
C. Set[tidius] C. f. Pup(inia) Fir[mus]	tribunus angusticlavius	67-70	Moesia	?	?	PME, S 45 (Pola, Regio X)
T. Rutilius Varus	tribunus angusticlavius	reign of Nero	Moesia	?	?	CIL X, 1258
M. Valerius M. f. Gal. Propinquus Grattius Cerealis	tribunus angusticlavius	84/85	Moesia	?	?	CIL II, 4251 = ILS 2711
L. Volcacius Primus	tribunus angusticlavius	reign of Claudius or Nero	Moesia	?	?	CIL IX, 5363 = ILS 2737
Marcus Opsius Navius Fannianus	tribunus angusticlavius	reign of Tiberius	?	?	?	IG XIV.719 (IGR I.431); Tacitus, Annales IV.68, 71
Ignotus	tribunus angusticlavius	reign of Claudius	Moesia	?	?	CIL X, 6442, PME, Inc 183
Ignotus	tribunus angusticlavius	reign of Claudius or Nero	Moesia	?	?	CIL XI, 4789, Spoletium, Regio VI, PME, Inc 204
C. Iulius Montanus	tribunus laticlavius	before 56	Moesia	?	?	CIL XI, 5884 = ILS 978; after Tacitus, Annales XIII, 25
Titus Junius Montanus	tribunus laticlavius	reign of Nero	Moesia	?	?	AE 1973, 500
Publius Aelius Hadrianus	tribunus laticlavius	c. 95				Historia Augusta, "Hadrian", 3
Marcus Acilius Priscus Egrilius Plarianus	tribunus laticlavius	after 95				CIL XIV, 155; CIL XIV, 4442; CIL XIV, 4444
Publius Cluvius Maximus Paullinus	tribunus laticlavius	before 127				AE 1940, 99
Gaius Javolenus Calvinus	tribunus laticlavius	before 138				CIL XIV, 2499 = ILS 1060
Gaius Julius Septimius Castinus	tribunus laticlavius	late 2nd century				CIL III, 10473
Q. Cornelius M. f. Gal(eria tribu) Valerianus	praefectus vexillationum	reign of Claudius	Thracia	?	?	CIL II, 3272; after CIL II, 2079 = ILS 2713
M. Clodius M. f. Fab(ia tribu) Ma[...]	praefectus vexillationum	prior 56/57	Italia	Brixia	?	CIL V, 4326

== See also ==
- List of Roman legions

== Bibliography ==
- livius.org account
- E. Ritterling, "Legio", RE XII, col. 1572-5
- Rumen Ivanov, "Lixa Legionis V Macedonicae aus Oescus", Zeitschrift für Papyrologie und Epigraphik 80, 1990, p. 131-136
- D. Barag, S. Qedar, "A Countermark of the Legio Quinta Scytica from the Jewish War", INJ 13 (1994–1999), pp. 66–69.
- S. Gerson, "A New Countermark of the Fifth Legion", INR 1 (2006), pp. 97–100
- Dr. Gerson, "A Coin Countermarked by Two Roman Legions", Israel Numismatic Journal 16, 2007–08, pp. 100–102
- P. M. Séjourné, "Nouvelles de Jérusalem", RB 6, 1897, p. 131
- E. Michon, "Inscription d'Amwas", RB 7, 1898, p. 269–271
- J. H. Landau, "Two Inscribed Tombstones", Atiqot, vol. XI, Jerusalem, 1976
