= Aliobrix =

Archaeological site in Ukraine

- City of the Goths
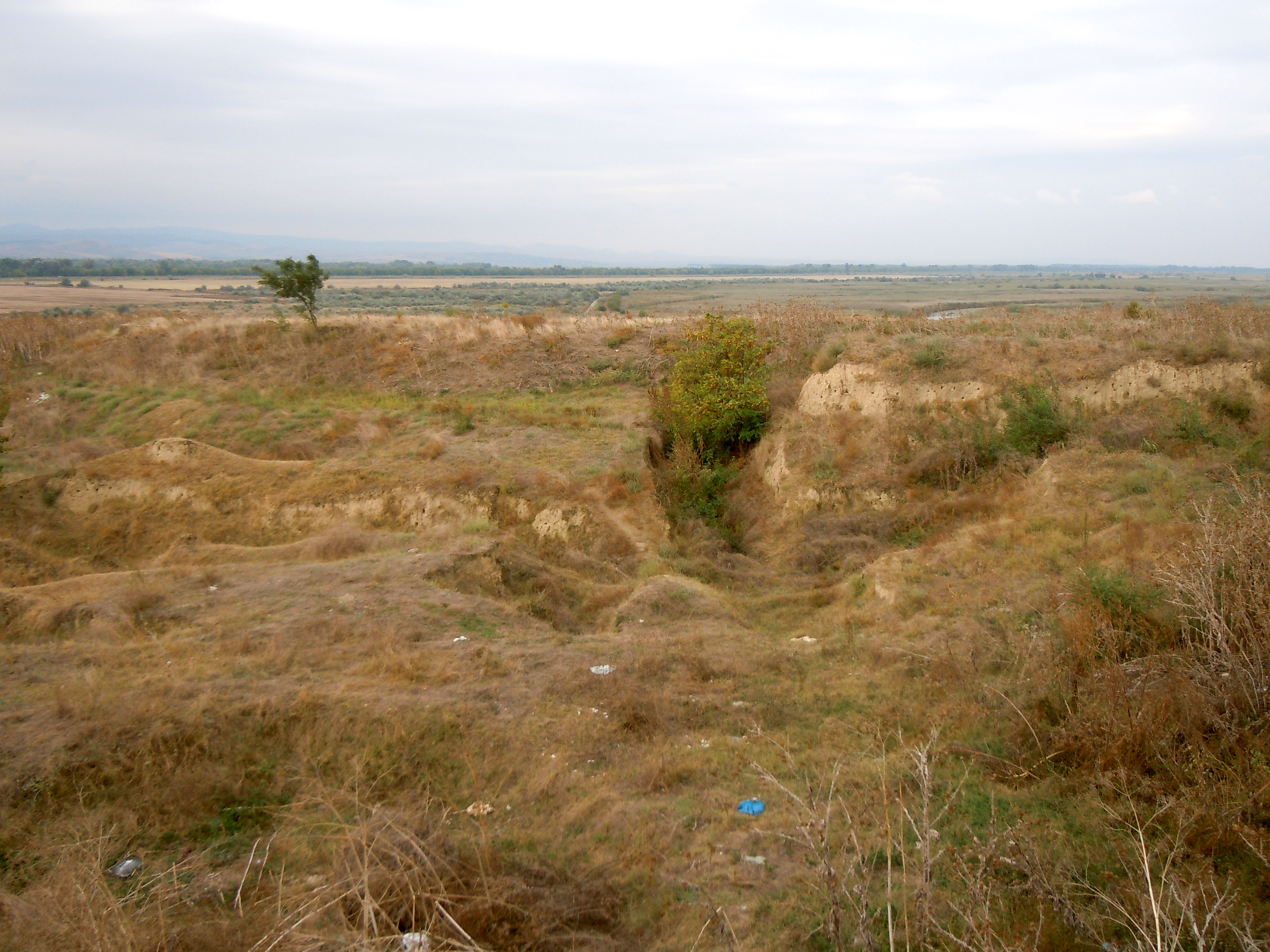
- Cartal archaeological site

- Location within Ukraine
- 45°19′9.79″N 28°24′48.35″E
- Location: Orlivka, Izmail Raion, Odesa Oblast, Ukraine

History
- Founded: c. 2nd–3rd centuries
- Abandoned: late 4th century

Site notes
- Condition: Ruined

Immovable Monument of National Significance of Ukraine
- Official name: Городище "Орлівка" ("Кам'яна Гора") (Orlivka hillfort (Kamiana Hill))
- Type: Archaeology
- Reference no.: 150021-Н

Aliobrix was a Roman fortification west of modern-day Orlivka, Ukraine. It served as the complementary fortress of Noviodunum ad Istrum on the opposite bank of the Danube, and was part of the broader Moesian Limes. The remains from Roman and other periods in the area form the multilayered Cartal (Kartal) archaeological complex.

== History ==
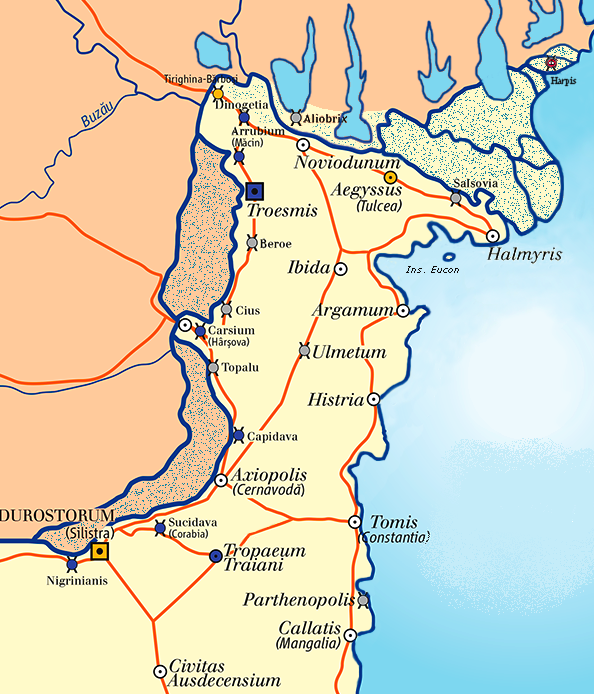
Moesian Limes

The earliest finds from the Cartal site date to 5th–4th centuries BC, with additional remains from the Bronze and Early Iron ages also excavated.

The fort was controlled by Dacian tribes before its capture by the Romans in c. 2nd–3rd centuries. The name Aliobrix is of Celtic origin. Together with Noviodunum ad Istrum, Aliobrix guarded an important Danube crossing, as well as a road north toward Tyras. This crossing was used by Roman troops in 369 under Emperor Valens during campaigns against the Goths or the Getae. Aliobrix was referred to as the "City of the Goths," either due to the presence of Goths or because of confusion with the Getae. The fort was abandoned in the late 4th century following Gothic invasions.

Although archaeological evidence confirms the existence of a Roman fortification in the area, it is unclear whether it was a stone castrum (fortress). An earthen vallum (rampart) northeast of the site, stretching between lakes Cahul and Kartal, may have been constructed by the Romans. Another vallum between lakes Kartal and Kuhurlui may suggest the existence of a military point near modern-day Novosilske.

A settlement of the Balkan–Danubian culture existed at the site in the 9th–11th centuries, and there are also archaeological findings belonging to the Byzantine Empire, the Golden Horde, and the Ottoman Empire.

== Research and preservation ==
The archaeological site was discovered in the 1840s when tablets bearing Latin inscriptions were found. In 1956, a quarry was constructed on the site and remained in operation until the 1990s, damaging the archaeological layers and reducing the area of Kamiana (Stone) Hill, where the site is located, from 2,000 to less than 1,500 m^{2}. During this period, archaeological excavations were conducted alongside slate mining. In the 1990s, the Orlivka Village Council approved the construction of a landfill on a part of the archaeological site. As of 2024, the land is no longer officially designated as a landfill; however, some locals continue to use it as such. A local community organization has been formed to promote and preserve the Cartal site. Archaeological excavations of the area have been carried out in 2023.
