= Scythia Minor =

Ancient region

Scythia Minor Μικρά Σκυθία
- Province of the Eastern Roman Empire
- c. 290–c. 680
- Major towns and colonies in Scythia Minor. Shoreline ca. 1
- Capital: Tomis
- Historical era: Late Antiquity
  - division by emperor Diocletian: c. 290
  - fall of the Danubian limes: 7th century
  - Bulgar conquest: c. 680
Preceded by	Succeeded by
Moesia Inferior	First Bulgarian Empire
- Today part of: Bulgaria; Romania

Scythia Minor or Lesser Scythia (Greek: Μικρά Σκυθία, romanized: Mikra Skythia) was a Roman province in late Antiquity, occupying the lands between the lower Danube and the Black Sea, the modern-day Dobruja region in Romania and Bulgaria. It was detached from Moesia Inferior by the Emperor Diocletian to form a separate province sometime between 286 and 293 CE. The capital of the province was Tomis (modern-day Constanța). It ceased to exist around 679–681, when the region was overrun by the Bulgars, which the Emperor Constantine IV was forced to recognize in 681.

According to the Laterculus Veronensis of c. 314 and the Notitia Dignitatum of c. 400, Scythia belonged to the Diocese of Thrace. Its governor held the title of praeses and its dux commanded two legions, Legio I Iovia and Legio II Herculia. The office of dux was replaced by that of quaestor exercitus, covering a wider area, in 536.

The indigenous population of Scythia Minor was Thracian and their material culture is apparent archaeologically into the sixth century. Roman villas have also been found. The cities were either ancient Greek foundations on the coast (like Tomis) or more recent Roman foundations on the Danube. Roman fortifications mostly date to the Tetrarchy or the Constantinian dynasty. Substantial repairs were made under Emperors Anastasius I and Justinian I, who granted the province fiscal immunity. By the fifth century, most of the troops stationed in Scythia were foederati of Germanic, Turkic, Hunnic or (perhaps) Slavic origin. They were a constant source of tension in the province.

Christianity flourished in Scythia Minor in the fifth and sixth centuries. Numerous Christian inscriptions have been found. Already in the fourth century, there is evidence of martyr cults there. Churches typically had relic crypts. Several prominent theologians hailed from Scythia, including John Cassian, Dionysius Exiguus and the Scythian monks.

== See also ==
- List of ancient towns in Scythia Minor

== Bibliography ==
- Kazhdan, Alexander (1991). "Scythia Minor". In Kazhdan, Alexander (ed.). The Oxford Dictionary of Byzantium. Oxford and New York: Oxford University Press. ISBN 0-19-504652-8.
- Rizos, Efthymios (2018). "Scythia Minor". In Nicholson, Oliver (ed.). The Oxford Dictionary of Late Antiquity. Oxford: Oxford University Press. ISBN 978-0-19-866277-8.
- Wiewiorowski, Jacek (2008). "Duces of Scythia Minor: A Prosopographical Study". Xenia Posnaniensia. Monografie Vol. Viii, Poznań 2008, Pp. 93, Isbn 978-83-60251-15-7. Poznán.
- Zahariade, Mihail (2006). Scythia Minor: A History of a Later Roman Province (284–681). Hakkert.
- Zahariade, Mihail (2017). "The Scythian Section of Notitia Dignitatum: A Structural and Chronological Analysis". In Nick Hodgson; Paul Bidwell; Judith Schachtmann (eds.). Roman Frontier Studies 2009: Proceedings of the XXI International Congress of Roman Frontier Studies (Limes Congress) held at Newcastle upon Tyne in August 2009. Archaeopress. pp. 509–518.
