= Legio I Iovia =

Roman legion

Legio I Iovia (lit. First Legion "Jovian", "devoted to Jupiter") was a Roman legion, levied by Emperor Diocletian (284–305), possibly together with II Herculia, to guard the newly created province of Scythia Minor. The cognomen of this legion came from Diocletian's attribute Iovianus, "similar to Jupiter". It was based at Noviodunum ad Istrum. According to Notitia Dignitatum, at the beginning of the 5th century I Iovia was still in its camp on the Danube. The legion may have even survived the fall of Rome and continued to serve the Byzantine empire.

== See also ==
- List of Roman legions
