= Boian culture =

Neolithic archaeological culture

- Alternative names: Giulești–Marița culture Marița culture
- Horizon: Old Europe
- Geographical range: Danube Valley: modern-day Romania and Bulgaria.
- Period: Neolithic, Chalcolithic
- Dates: 4300–3500 BC
- Preceded by: Dudești culture Eastern LBK
- Followed by: Hamangia culture, Gumelnița culture, Cucuteni-Trypillia culture

The Boian culture (dated to 4300–3500 BC), also known as the Giulești–Marița culture or Marița culture, is a Neolithic archaeological culture of Southeast Europe. It is primarily found along the lower course of the Danube in what is now Romania and Bulgaria, and thus may be considered a Danubian culture.

== Geography ==
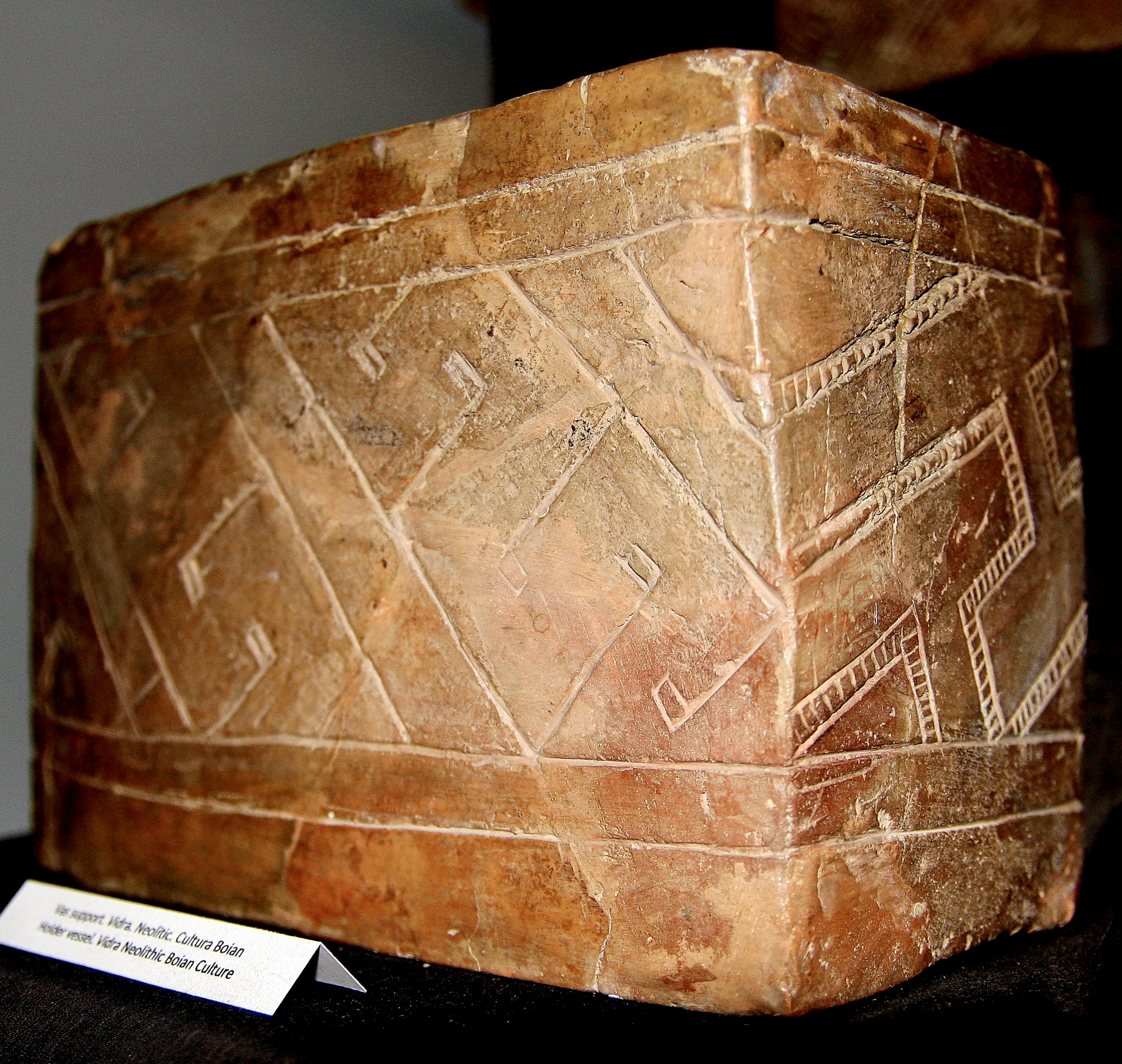
Boian ceramic

The Boian culture originated on the Wallachian Plain north of the Danube River in southeastern Romania. At its peak, the culture expanded to include settlements in the Bărăgan Plain and the Danube Delta in Romania, Dobruja in eastern Romania and northeastern Bulgaria, and the Danubian Plain and the Balkan Mountains in Bulgaria. The culture's geographical extent went as far west as the Jiu River on the border of Transylvania in south-central Romania, as far north as the Chilia branch of the Danube Delta along the Romanian border with Ukraine and the coast of the Black Sea, and as far south as the Rhodope Mountains and the Aegean Sea in Greece.

The type site of the Boian culture is located on an island on Lake Boian in the region of Muntenia, on the Wallachian Plain north of the Danube River.

== Chronology ==
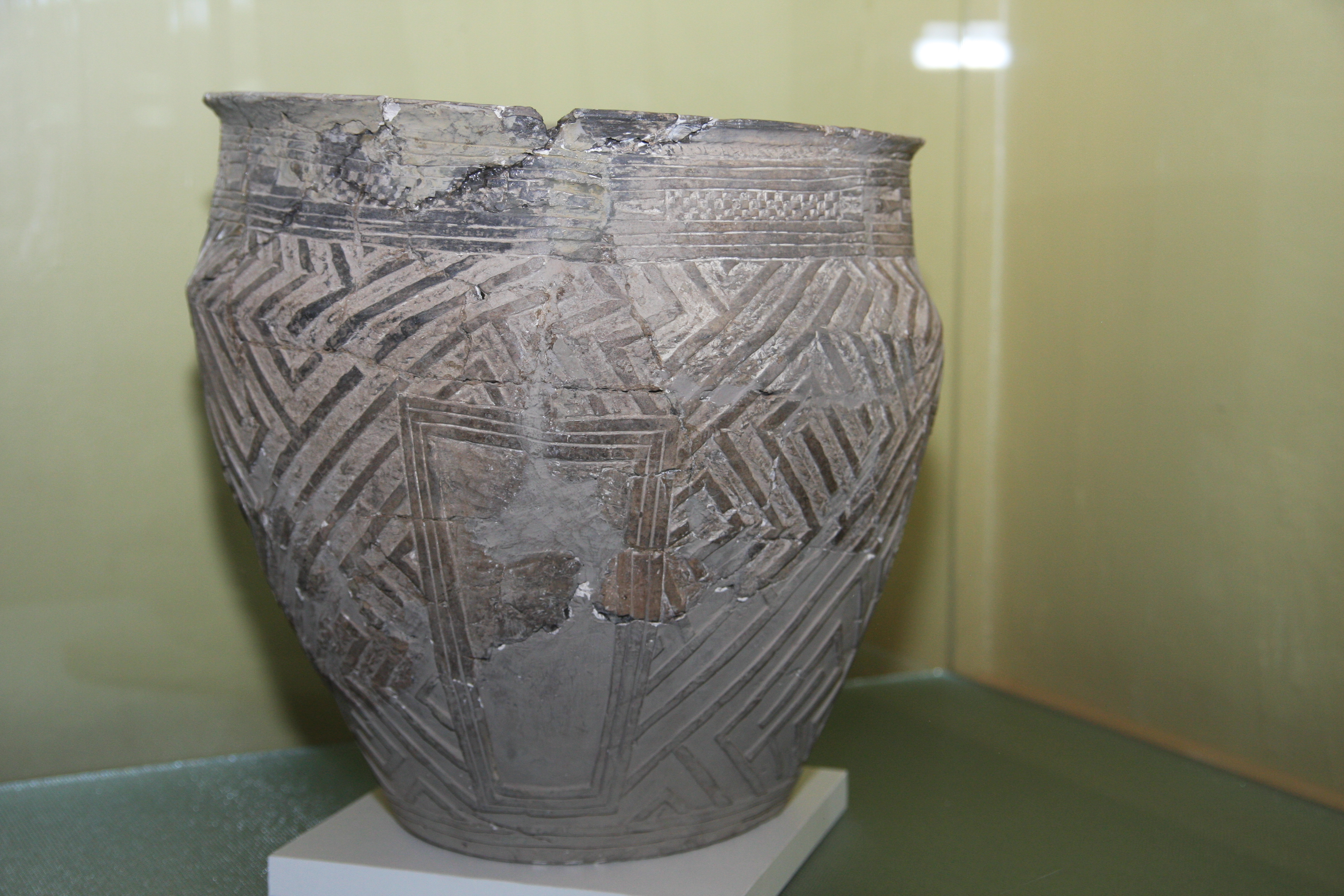
Boian culture pottery

The Boian culture emerged from two earlier Neolithic groups: the Dudeşti culture that originated in Anatolia (present-day Turkey); and the Musical note culture (also known as the Middle Linear Pottery culture or LBK) from the northern Subcarpathian region of southeastern Poland and western Ukraine.

=== Periodization ===
The Boian culture is divided traditionally into four phases, each of which is given a name of one of the archaeological sites that are associated with it:

- Phase I – Bolintineanu Phase, 4300–4200 BC.
- Phase II – Giulești Phase (also known as the Giulești-Boian culture), 4200–4100 BC.
- Phase III – Vidra Phase, 4100–4000 BC.
- Phase IV – Spanțov Phase (also known as the Boian-Gumelnița culture), 4000–3500 BC.

=== Decline ===
The Boian culture ended through a smooth transition into the Gumelnița culture, which also borrowed from the Vădastra culture. However, a segment of the Boian society ventured to the northeast along the Black Sea coast, encountering the late Hamangia culture, which they eventually merged with to form the Cucuteni-Trypillian culture.

The time when the Boian culture developed into the Gumelnița culture is referred to as a transitional period, during which there are commonalities found on both sides of the chronological divide between the two cultures; as such, Boian Phase IV and Gumelnița Phase A1 may be considered as a single, uninterrupted, transitional phase. (Note: Coincidentally, the Gumelnița culture is also divided into four separate phases, A1, A2, B1 and B2. (See Boardman reference.)) As a result, there are frequent references to this by scholars, who use the term Boian-Gumelnița culture to describe this specific period. Sometimes, though, this term is mis-used by some to include both the entire Boian culture and Gumelnița culture periods, not just the transitional period overlapping the two cultures. Since each culture is distinct from the other during its main phases, they should each be considered and named separately, with the exception (as just mentioned) of the transitional phases of their development.

== Settlements ==
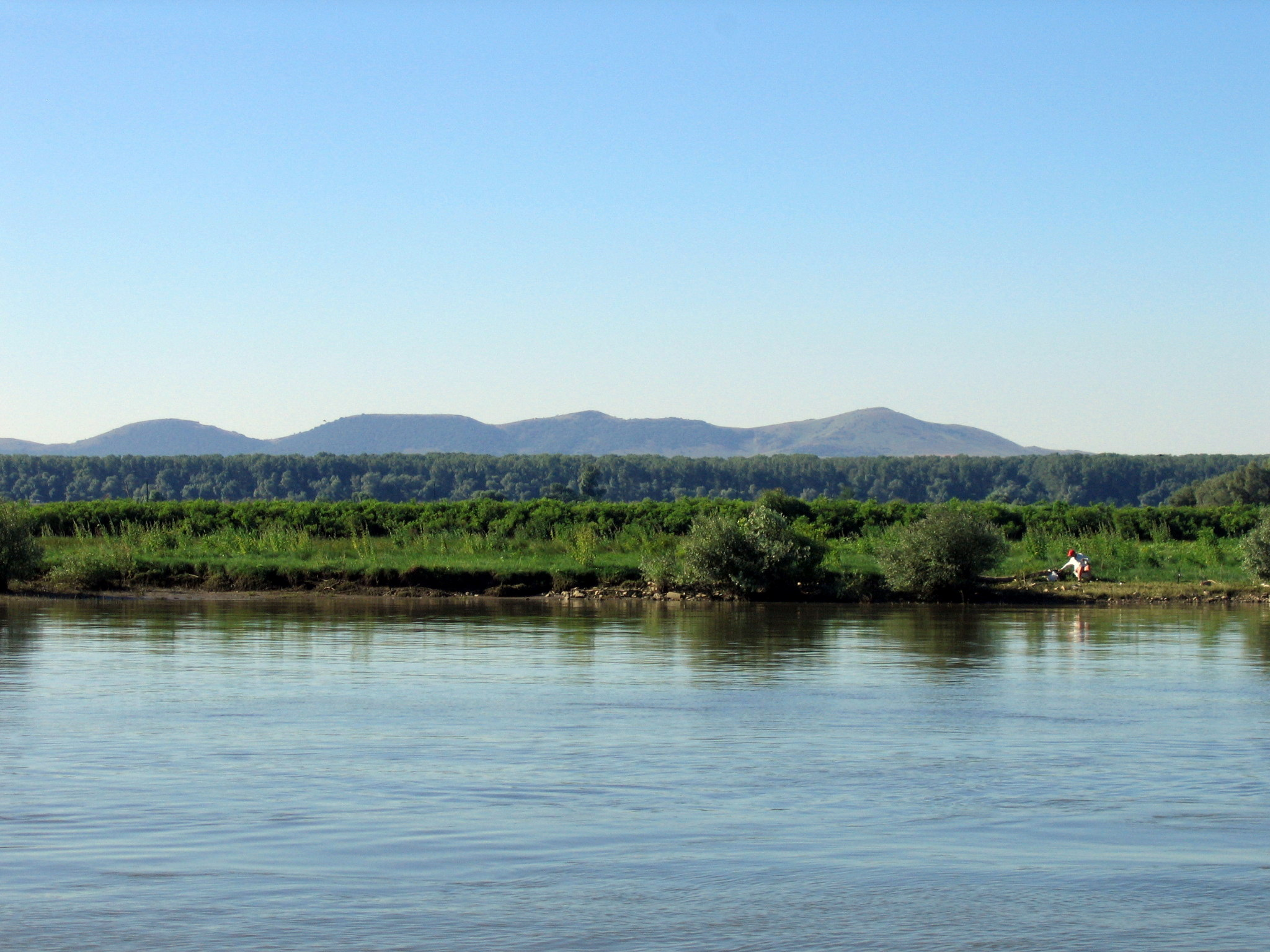
The Danube Delta in Romania

Boian archaeological sites have tended to be found next to rivers and lakes that had rich floodplains that provided fertile soil for agriculture. There were three different types of structures found in Boian sites. During Boian phases I and II the dwellings of this culture were thrown-together, oval-shaped lean-to or dugout pit-house shelters built into river banks and ledges. In Boian phases III and IV the dwellings became more sophisticated, resulting in structures that were small with raised wooden platform floors. The third type of houses were larger, rectangular (up to 7 by 3.5 meters, or 23 by 11.5 feet) wattle and daub structures with wooden platform floors covered in clay, and roughly-thatched roofs, built at ground level.

During phases III and IV the first settlements began to appear, resulting in the first of this region's archaeological tells. These settlements were typically built on high, steep terraces or headlands above the floodplain of the rivers or lakes that were always nearby. At this time the houses began to incorporate more sophisticated elements, such as raised platform floors, painted interior walls exhibiting geographic designs in red and white patterns, painted clay furniture, and indoor clay ovens. Later settlements also sometimes showed signs of possible fortification in the form of deep, wide defensive ditches.

The settlements in Phase III showed indications of having intersettlement and intrasettlement hierarchy, based on the sizes and locations of the residential buildings, which were built in nucleated rows around a central location. In Phase IV surface houses became dominant over subterranean, and the settlements grew to include up to 150 people.

== Economy ==
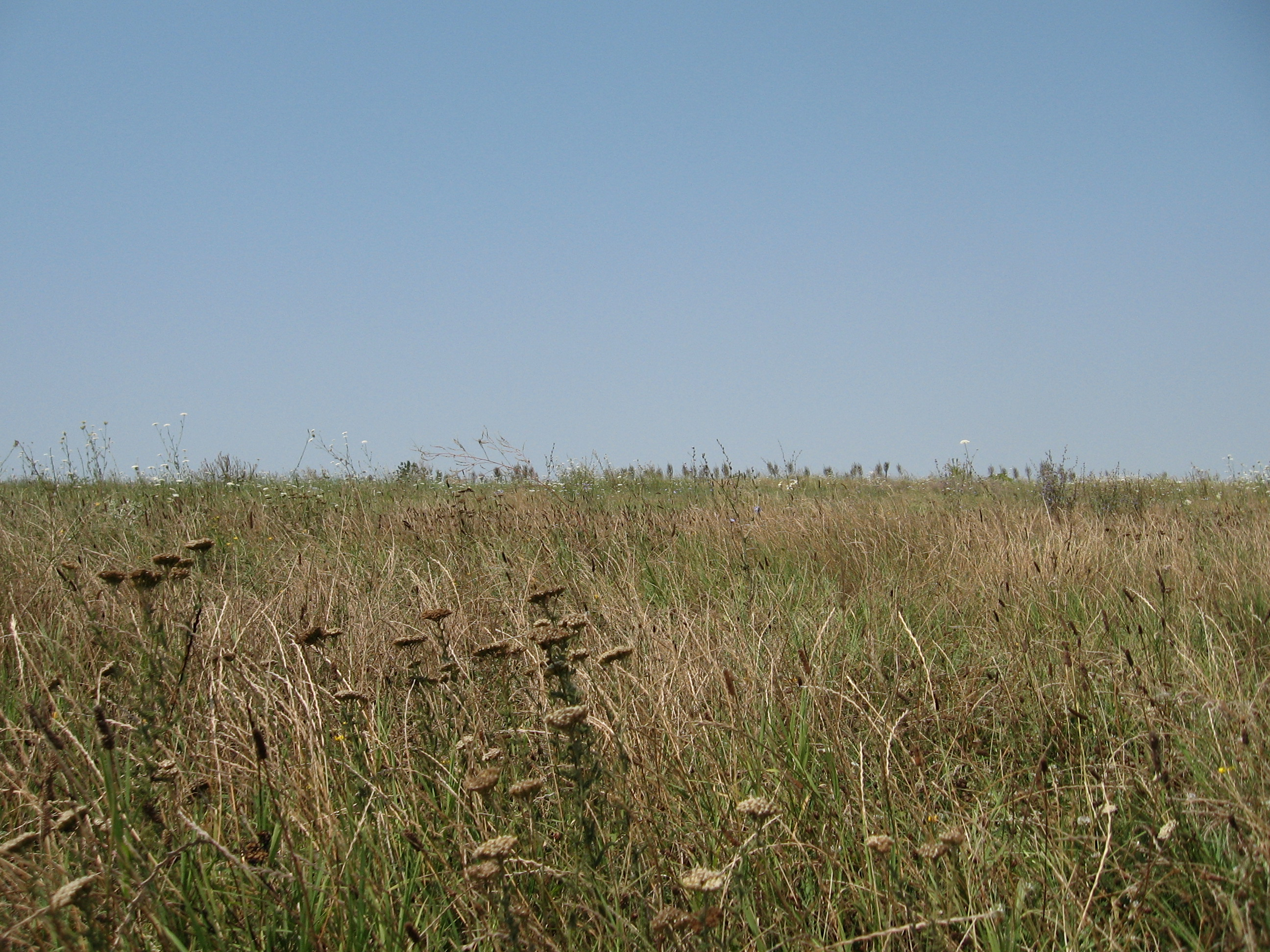
Native vegetation of the Wallachian Plain

Their economy was characterized by the practice of agriculture, animal husbandry, hunting, gathering and fishing. The proximity of their settlements to deciduous forests and steppe vegetation provided a good supply of wild game for their diet and fuel for their fires, tools, and homes. In addition, their nearness to rivers, lakes, and marshes provided a good source of game fowl and fish, as well as a source of lithic materials (stone and clay) from the banks.

Archaeological evidence indicates that members of the Boian culture included the following animals in their diet, or used their furs, bones, or flesh for making tools and clothes:

- Bos primigenius (aurochs)
- Bos taurus (cattle)
- Canis lupus (gray wolf)
- Canis lupus familiaris (domestic dog)
- Capra hircus (goat)
- Capreolus capreolus (roe deer)
- Castor fiber (European beaver)
- Cervus elaphus (red deer)
- Equus ferus (wild horse)
- Lepus europaeus (European hare)
- Meles meles (European badger)
- Ovis aries (domestic sheep)
- Sus domesticus (domestic pig)
- Sus scrofa (wild boar)
- Unio ssp (freshwater mussel)
- Vulpes vulpes (red fox)

== Material culture ==
Boian pottery exhibited influences from the earlier cultures from which it arose: chequers and flutings from the Dudești culture, and small triangles bordering the lines it inherited from the Musical Note Linear culture. The pottery was polished after firing, and was decorated with carved or raised geometric designs, often with white clay used as an inlaid relief to offset the charcoal grey or black clay used in the rest of the work. In addition to the black/grey and white pottery, a few localized examples of red-inlaid clay decoration were found. Beginning in Phase III, they began to use graphite paint to decorate their pottery, a method probably borrowed from the south Balkan Marica culture. (Note: The Marica culture (also known as Maritsa or Maritza) is now equated with the Karanovo V culture, and considered by Todorova to be early and middle Eneolithic (see Ehrich reference).) The Boian culture continued to improve its ceramic technology until it reached its height during Phase III, after which it began to decline in quality and workmanship.

The use of lithic technology occurred throughout this culture's existence, attested to by the presence of debitage found next to various types of shaped flint and polished stone tools. Towards the end of its existence copper artifacts began to be found, made from the high-grade copper found in the Balkan Mountains of Bulgaria. There is evidence that the Boian culture acquired the technology for copper metallurgy; as a result, this culture bridged the change from the Neolithic to the Copper Age.

Unlike later cultures that followed, there have not been many artifacts found in Boian culture sites of sculptures or figurines. However, the oldest bone figurine in Romania was found at the Cernica site, dating back to Phase I.

== See also ==
- Prehistoric Romania
- Prehistory of Southeastern Europe
- Neolithic Europe
