= Gumelnița culture =

Neolithic culture of Europe

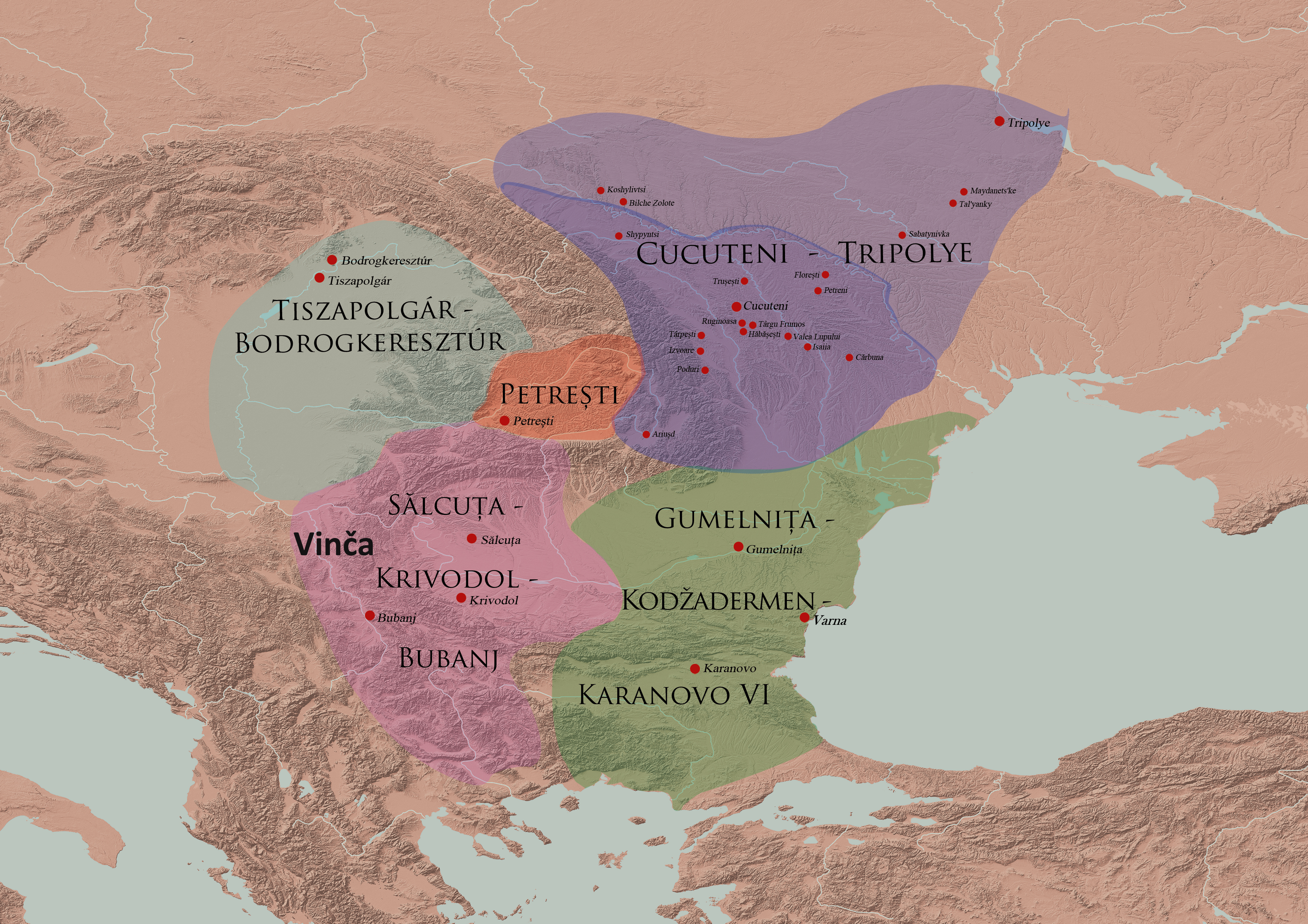
- Horizon: Old Europe
- Period: Neolithic, Chalcolithic
- Dates: c. 4700 BC – c. 3950 BC
- Preceded by: Boian culture, Karanovo culture
- Followed by: Varna culture, Cernavodă culture

The Gumelniţa culture was a Chalcolithic culture of the 5th millennium BC (c. 4700–4000 BC), named after the Gumelniţa site on the left (Romanian) bank of the Danube.

== Geography ==
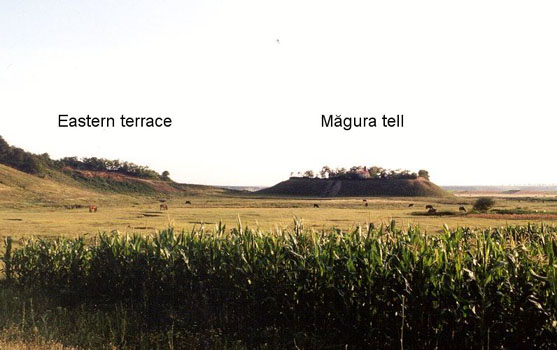
Măgura/Pietrele tell site (settlement mound), Romania

The Gumelniţa culture was part of the broader Gumelniţa-Kodžadermen-Karanovo VI complex. This evolved out of the earlier Boian, and Karanovo V cultures. Gumelniţa-Kodžadermen-Karanovo VI is also aggregated with the Varna culture. The Gumelniţa culture was supplanted by the Cernavodă culture in the early 4th millennium BC.

== Periodization ==
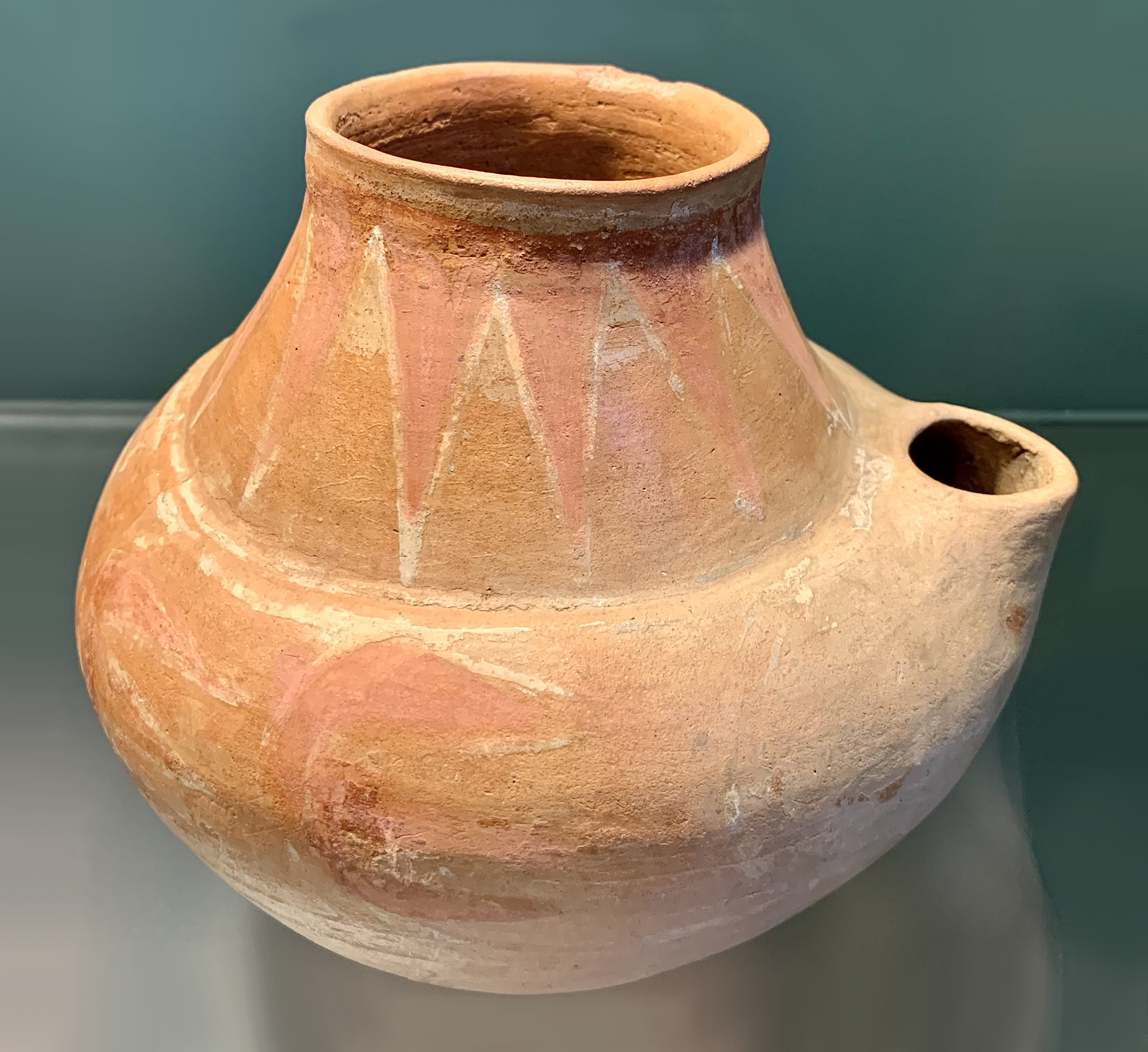
Painted ceramic vessel

"One of the most flourishing civilizations from the last half of the 5th millenium [sic] BC is (next to the Ariuşd Cucuteni – Tripolie complex) Gumelniţa Culture... absolute chronology, still under discussion, according to the latest calibrated data, assigns this culture (as mentioned above) to the limits of the last half of the 5th millenium [sic] BC and maybe to early 4th millenium [sic] BC." — Silvia Marinescu-Bîlcu, Gumelniţa Culture.

This matches the view of Blagoje Govedarica (2004).

The first periodization of Gumelniţa culture was suggested by VI. Dumitrescu who split the civilization of Gumelniţa into two phases: A and B. Later on, Dinu V. Rosetti divided the civilization into Al, A2 and B1, B2.

=== Gumelniţa A ===
With a centric evolution from geographic point of view, the intensity of the cultural trends decreased from the center towards peripheral area. Having a strong Boian background at the origins, mixed with Maritza elements, the Gumelniţa culture lasted short of a millennium from the beginning of the Chalcolithic to the start of the fourth millennium BC.

==== Gumelniţa A1 ====
4700–4350.

==== Gumelniţa A2 ====
4500–3950. The regional characteristics of A1 phase are diminished, and more uniform characteristics are identified in discovered artifacts.

=== Synchronisms ===
Gumelnita Culture	Adiacent Culture 1	Adiacent Culture 2	Adiacent Culture 3
Gumelniţa A1	Precucuteni 3	Cucuteni A1 – A2	Varna 1
Gumelniţa A2	Cucuteni A3	the beginning of the Cernavoda 1 culture	

== Art ==
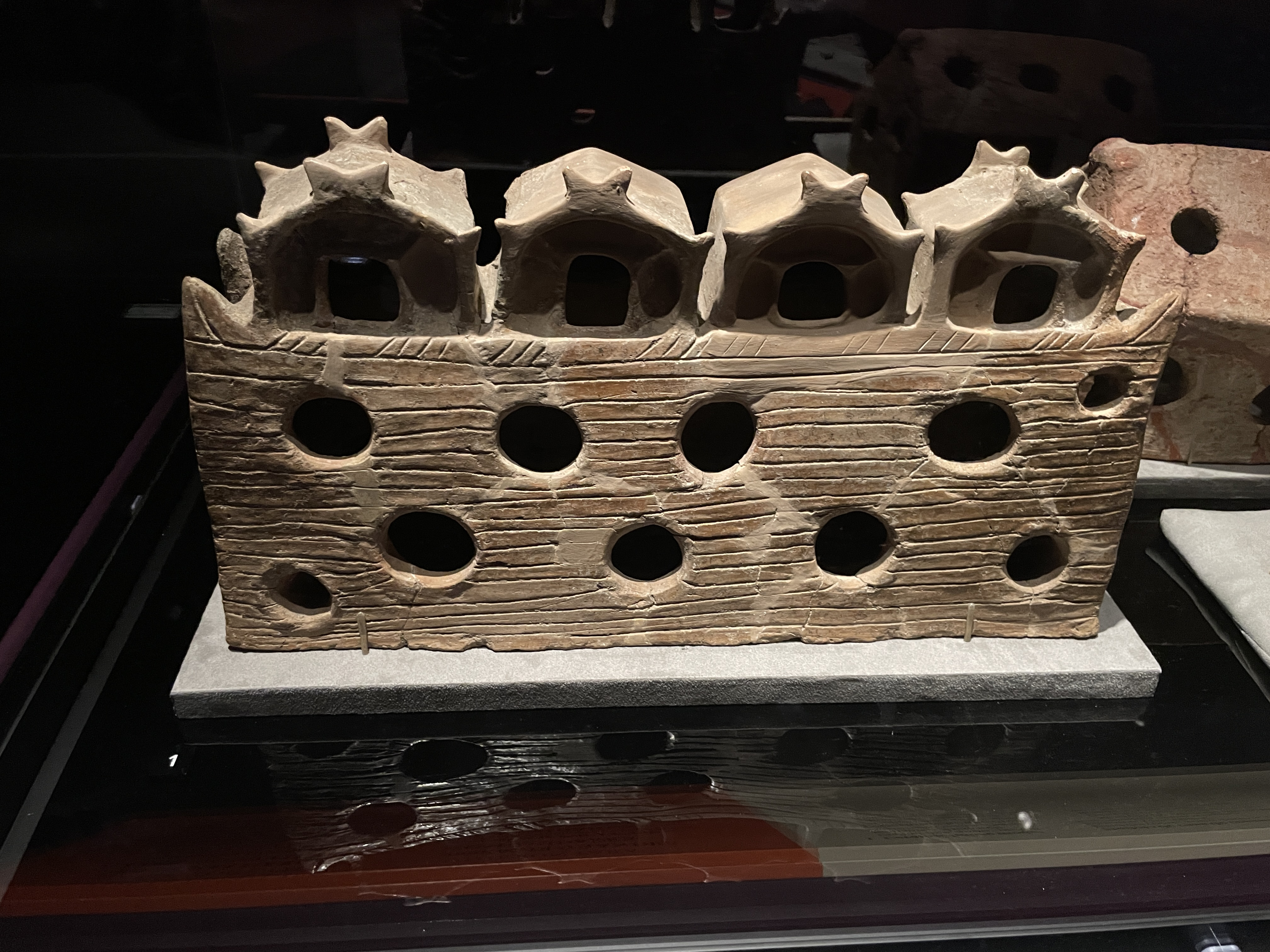
Architectural model from Cascioarele, Romania, 4600–3900 BC

The Gumelniţa is remarkable by the richness of its anthropomorphic and zoomorphic representations. Some consider the achievements of prehistoric craftsmen to be true masterpieces.

The representation from Gumelnița art differ by other cultures by the following:

- statuettes morphology characterised by expressivity, gesture and attitude.
- modelling technique
- arms positions on the belly, stretched laterally, in the position of the "thinker"
- sex representation
- decoration pattern

Seashell ornament is relatively common. At least some of the shellfish used come from the Aegean regions, for example the spondylas and the dentals.

As evidence from archaeology, thousands of artifacts from Neolithic Europe have been discovered, mostly in the form of female figurines. As a result a 'mother goddess' theory was proposed. The leading proponent was the archaeologist Marija Gimbutas. This interpretation is still a subject of great controversy in archaeology due to Gimbutas' many inferences about the symbols on artifacts.

The analysis of the finds uncovered by archaeological excavations revealed a few characteristics of the Gumelniţa objects of art, likely to lead to a few main trends of the spiritual life investigation.

"The prevalence of a female character is clear, as it represents 34% of all the anthropomorphic representations. That might represent a deity, the term having a general significance, of worship, without being able to specify under the current stage of the researches which is the nature and status of this deity. The male representations are very few, about 1%, while about 10% are the asexual representations, therefore with no sign (breasts, sexual triangle) which might point to the sex of the statuette." — Gumelniţa Anthropomorphic and Zoomorphic Objects of Art by Radian Romus Andreescu.

== Gallery ==
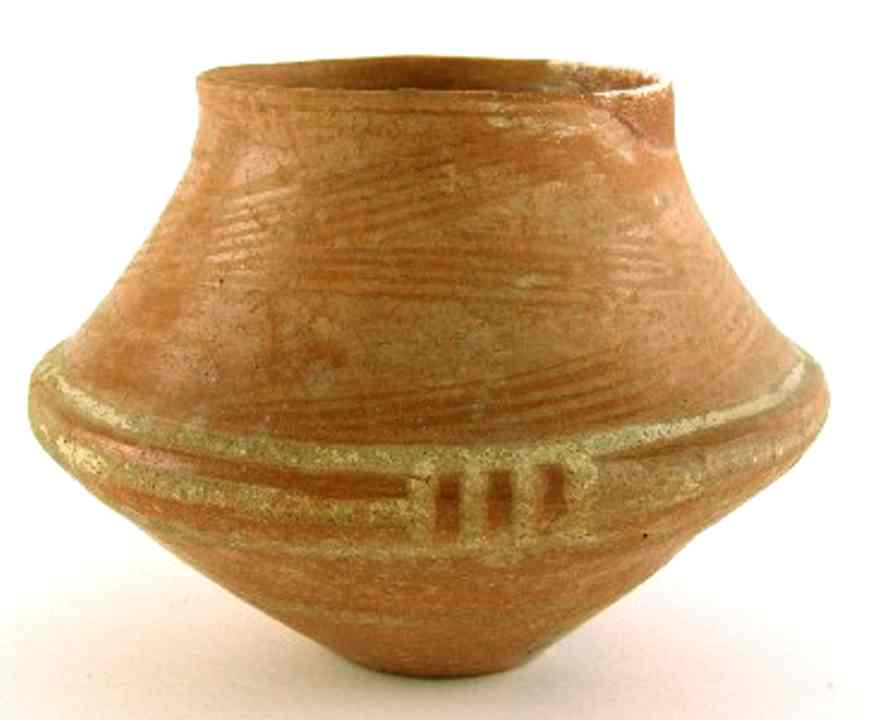

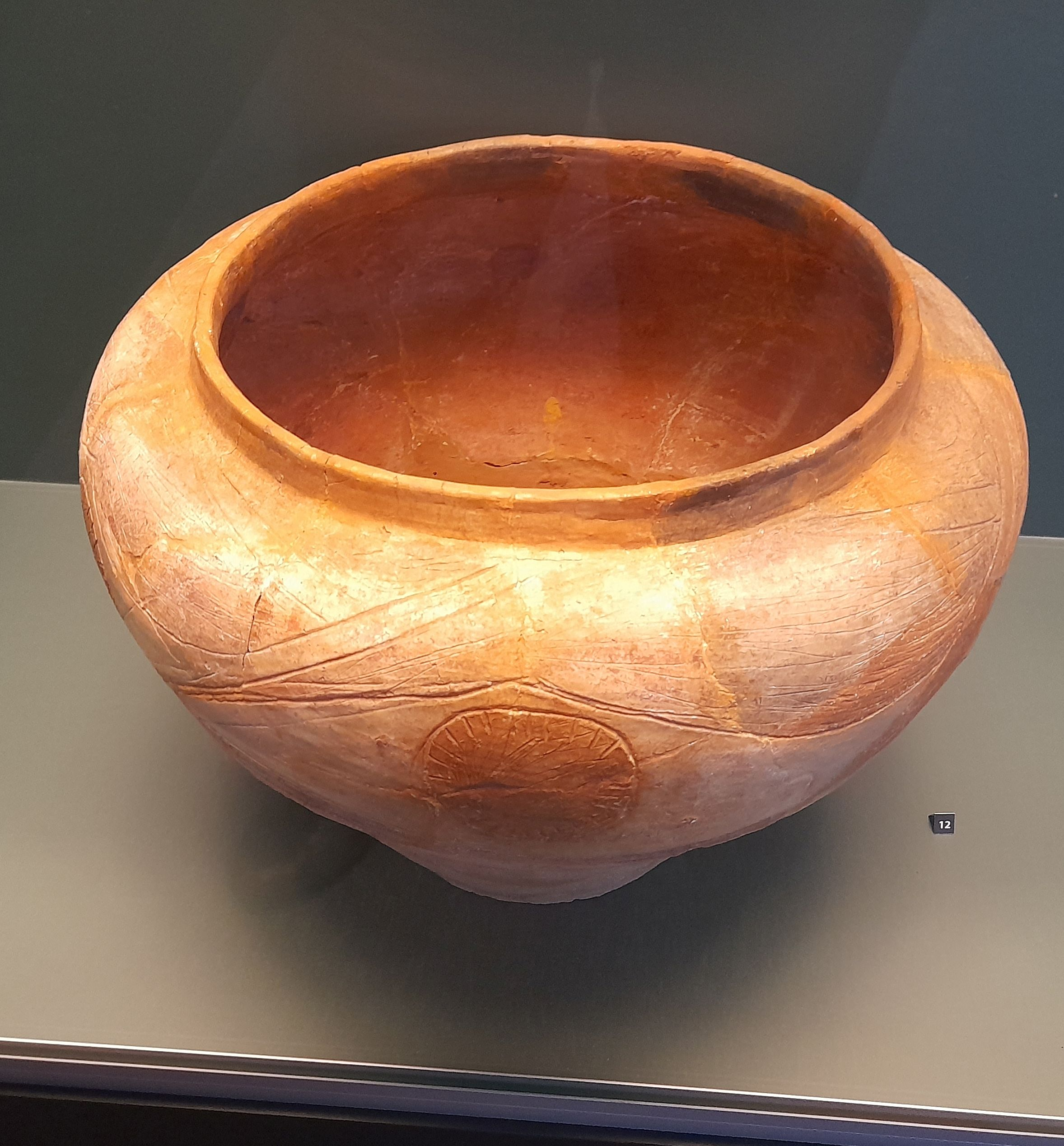

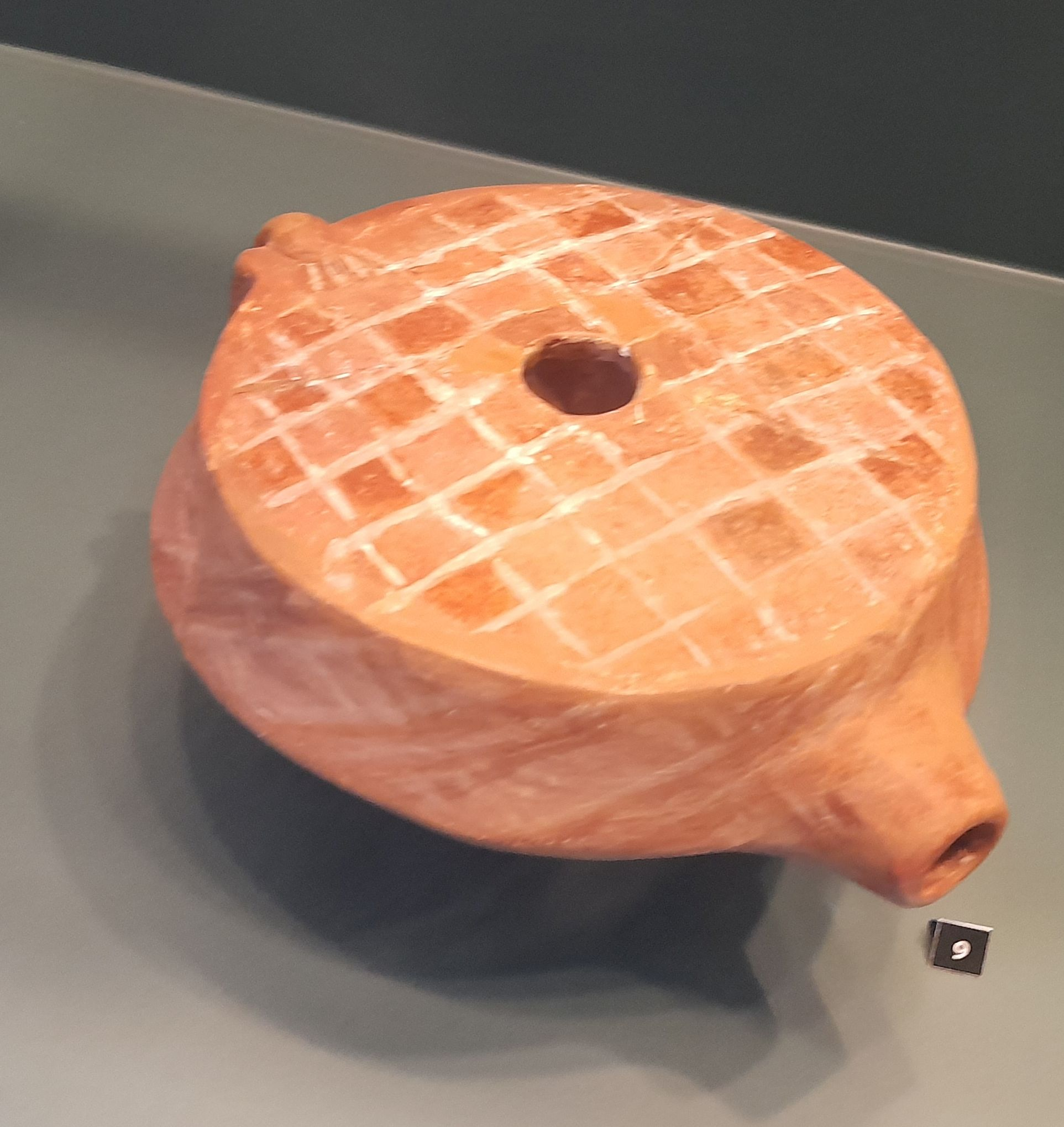

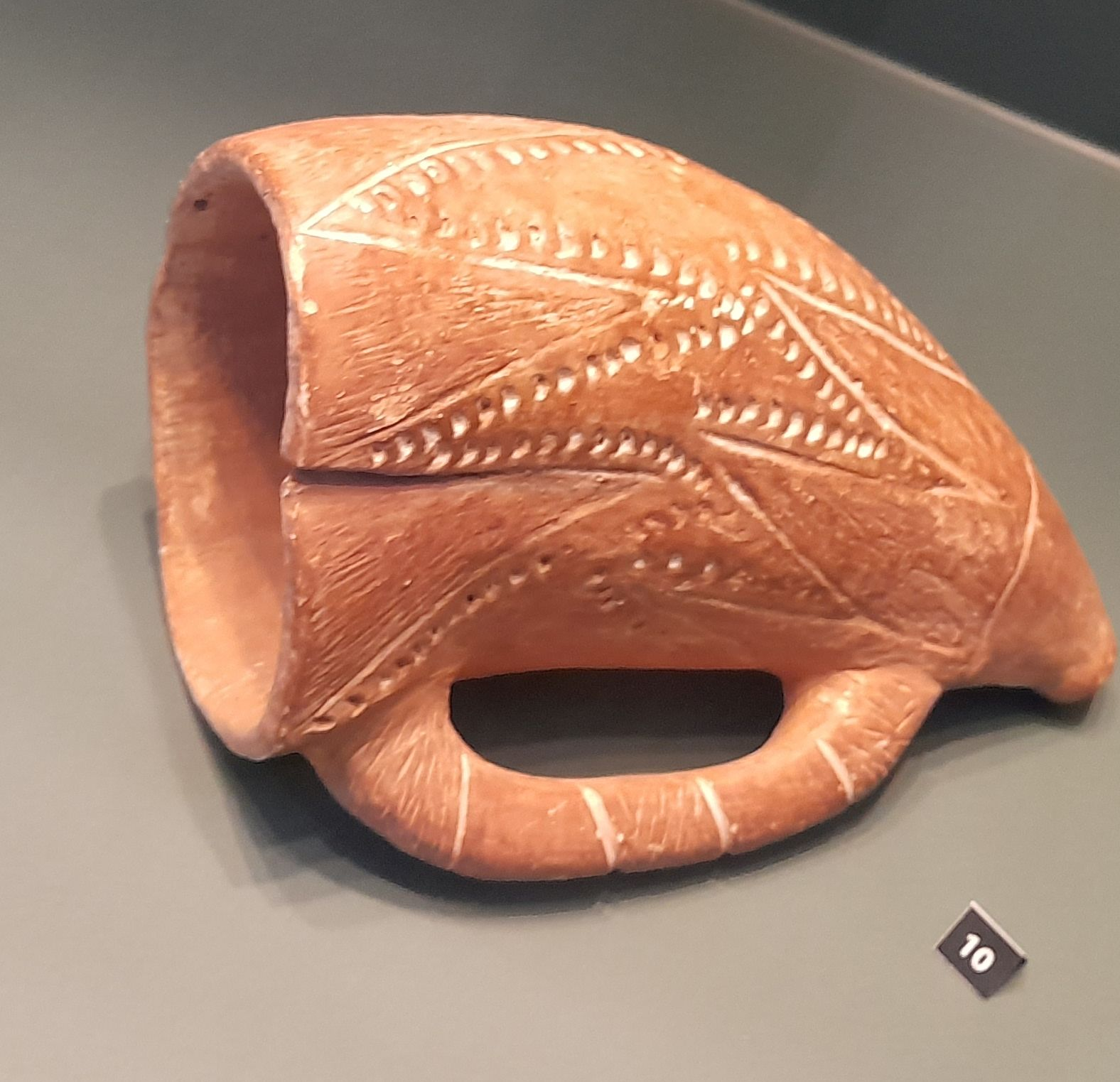

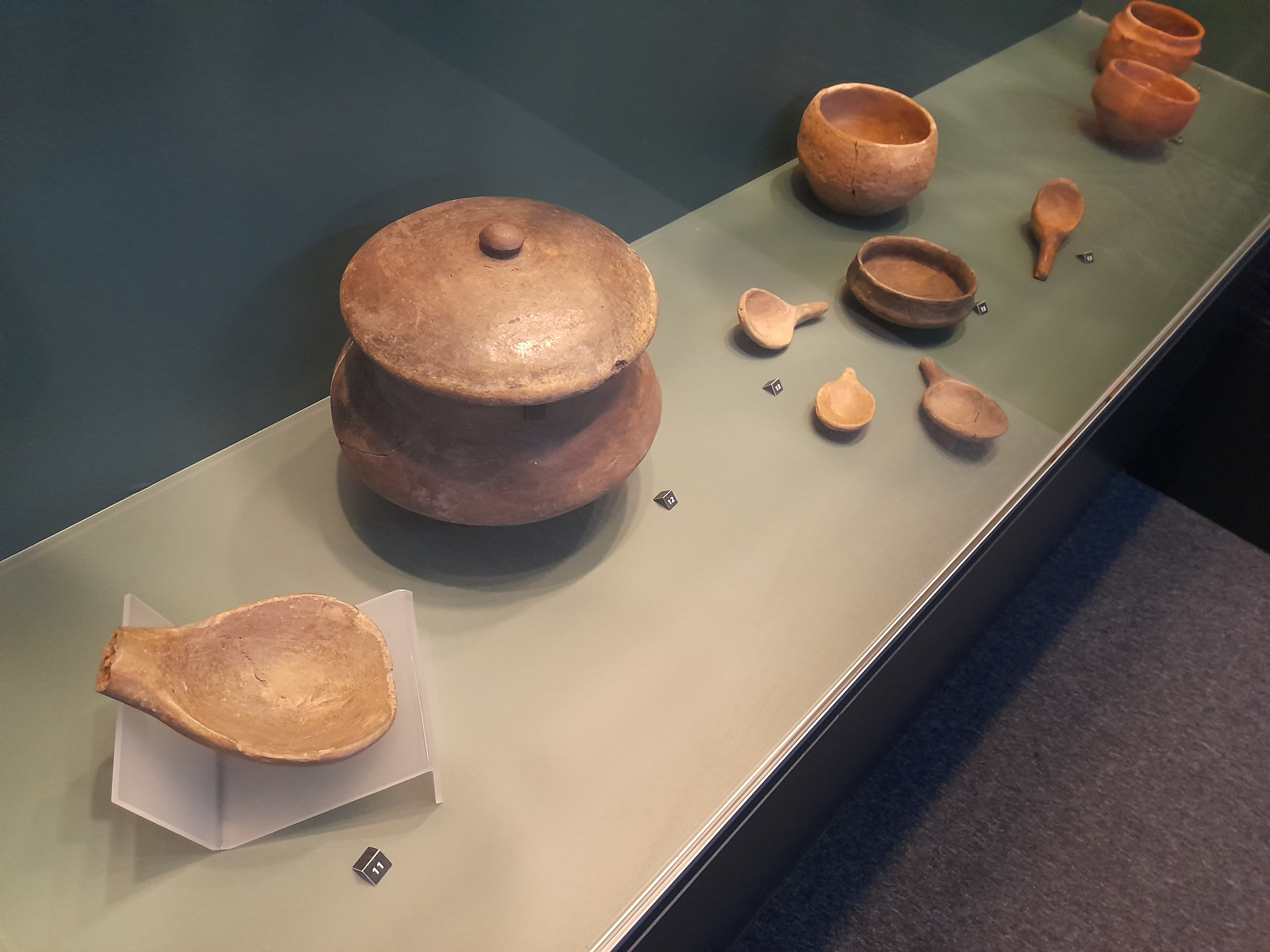

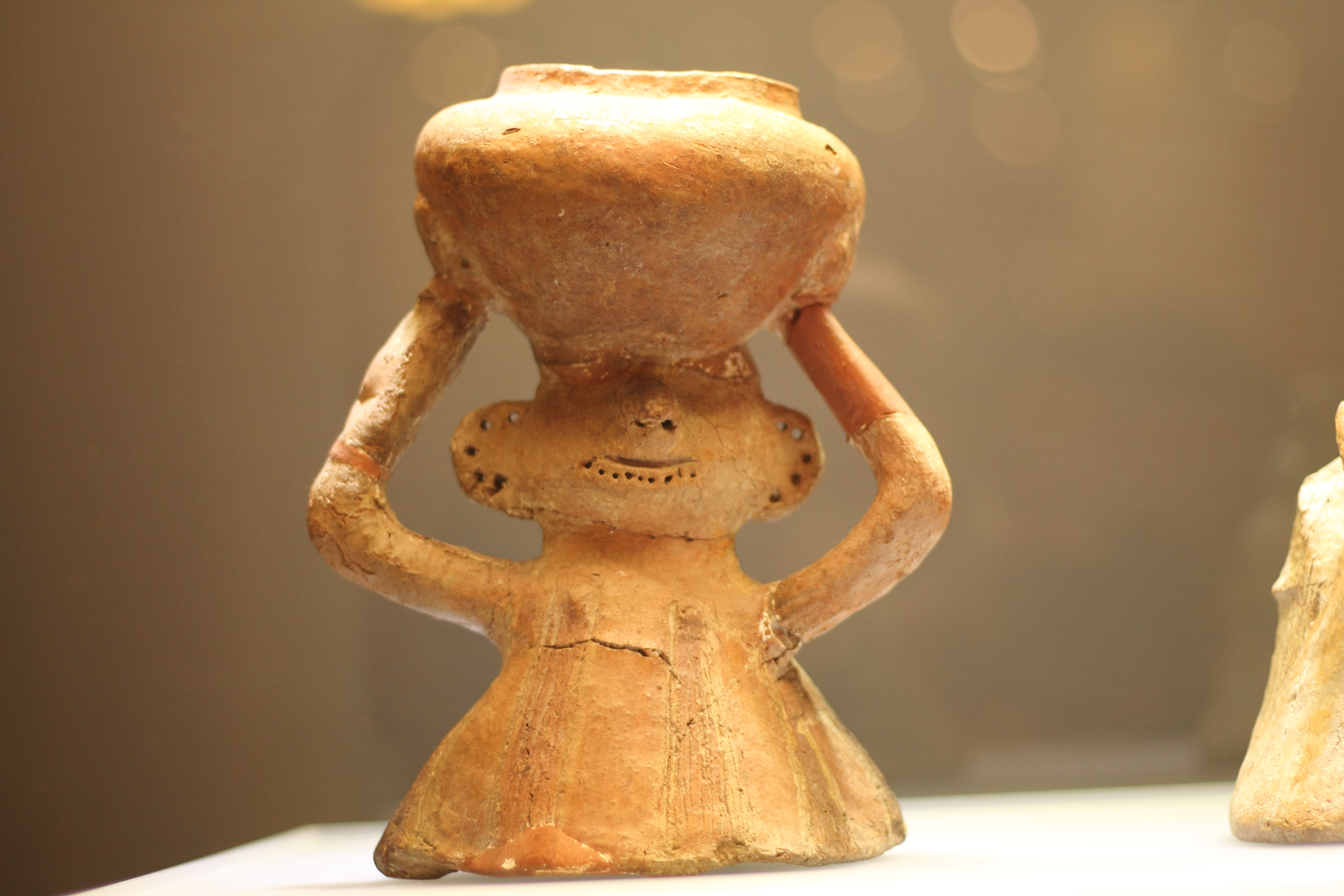

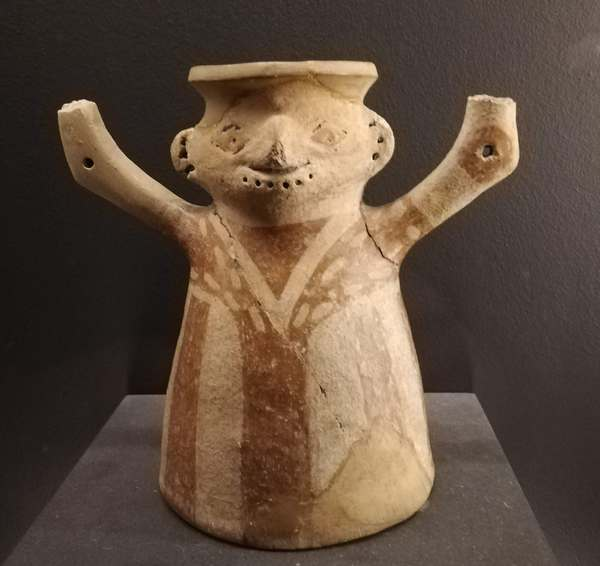

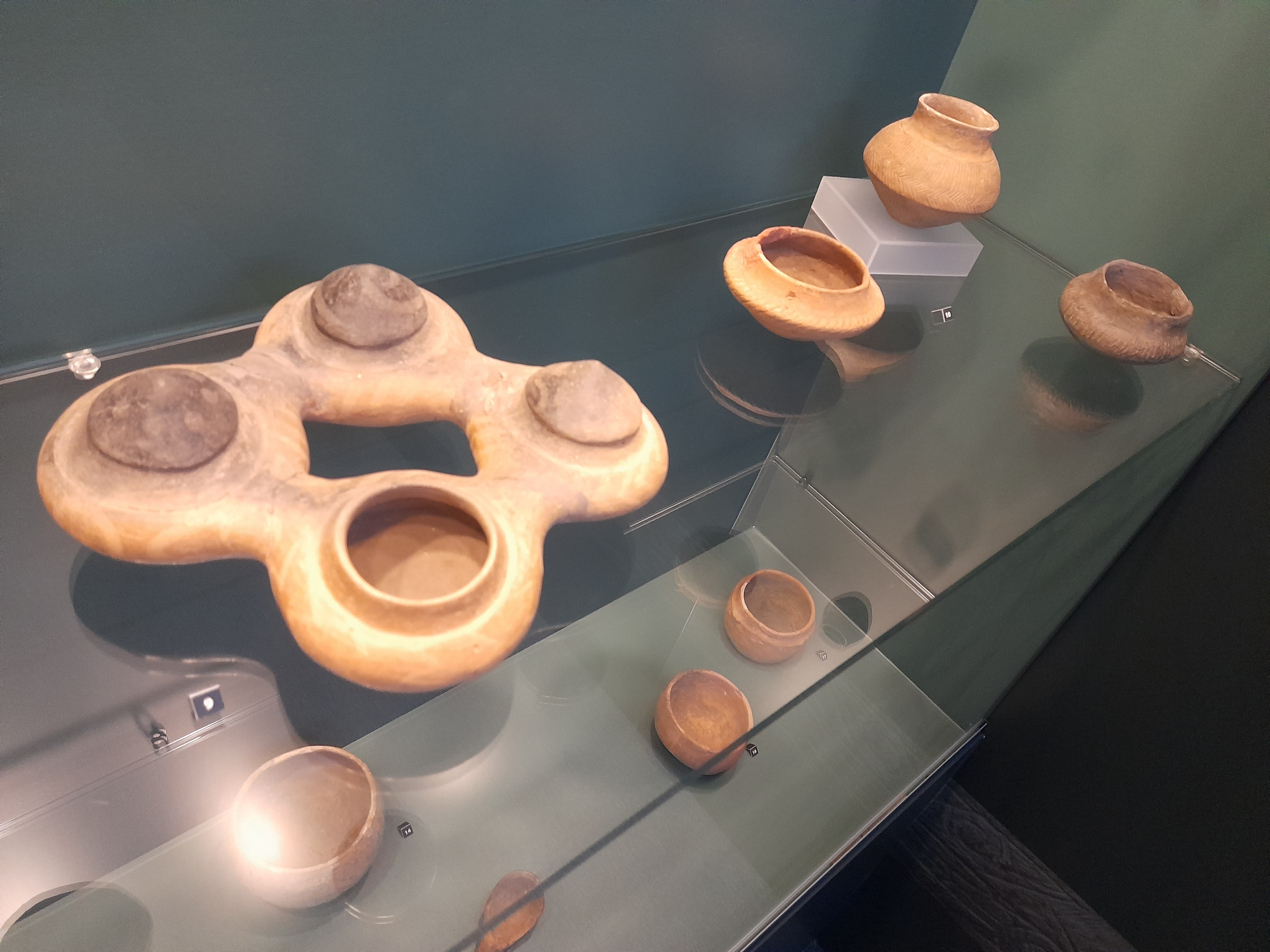

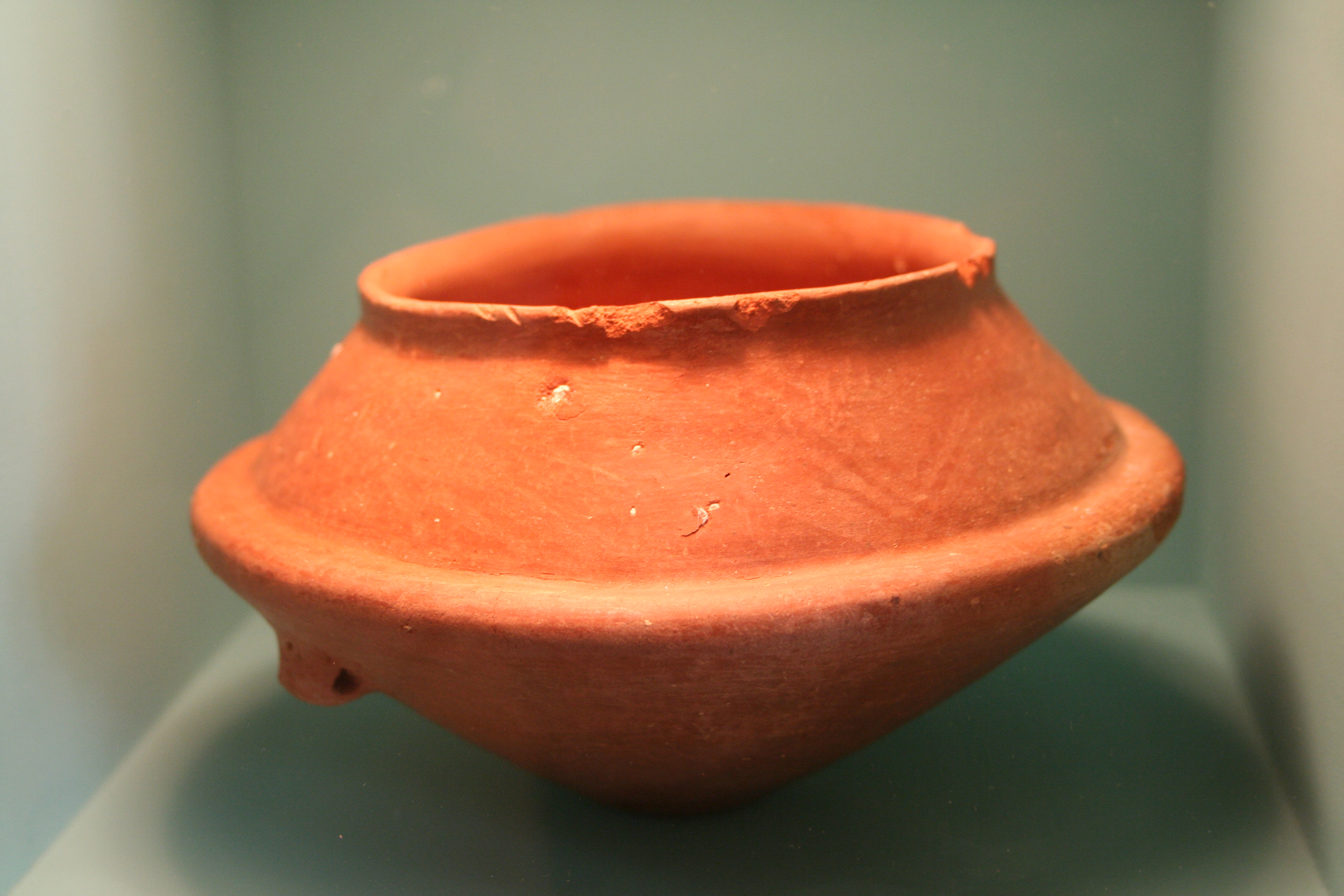

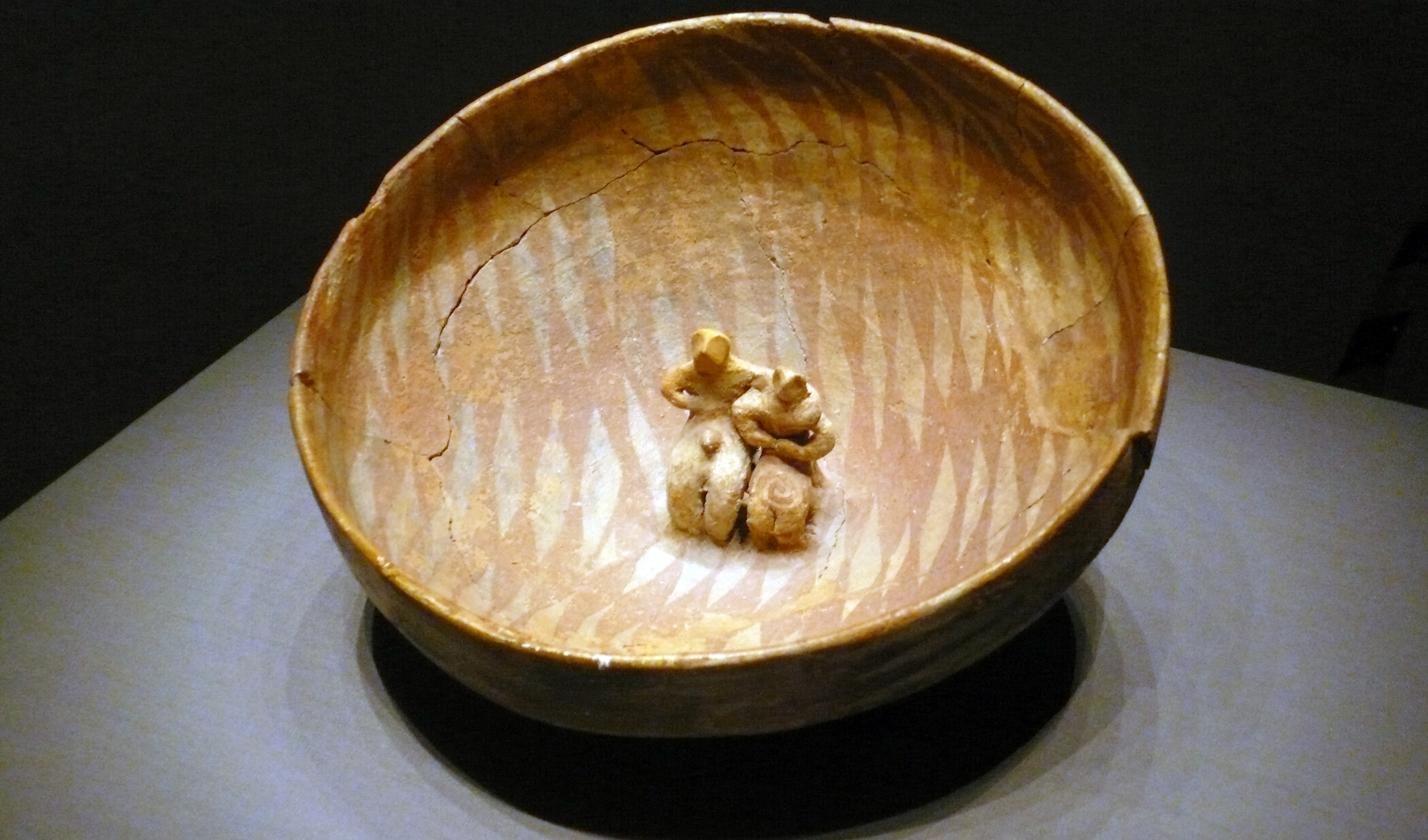

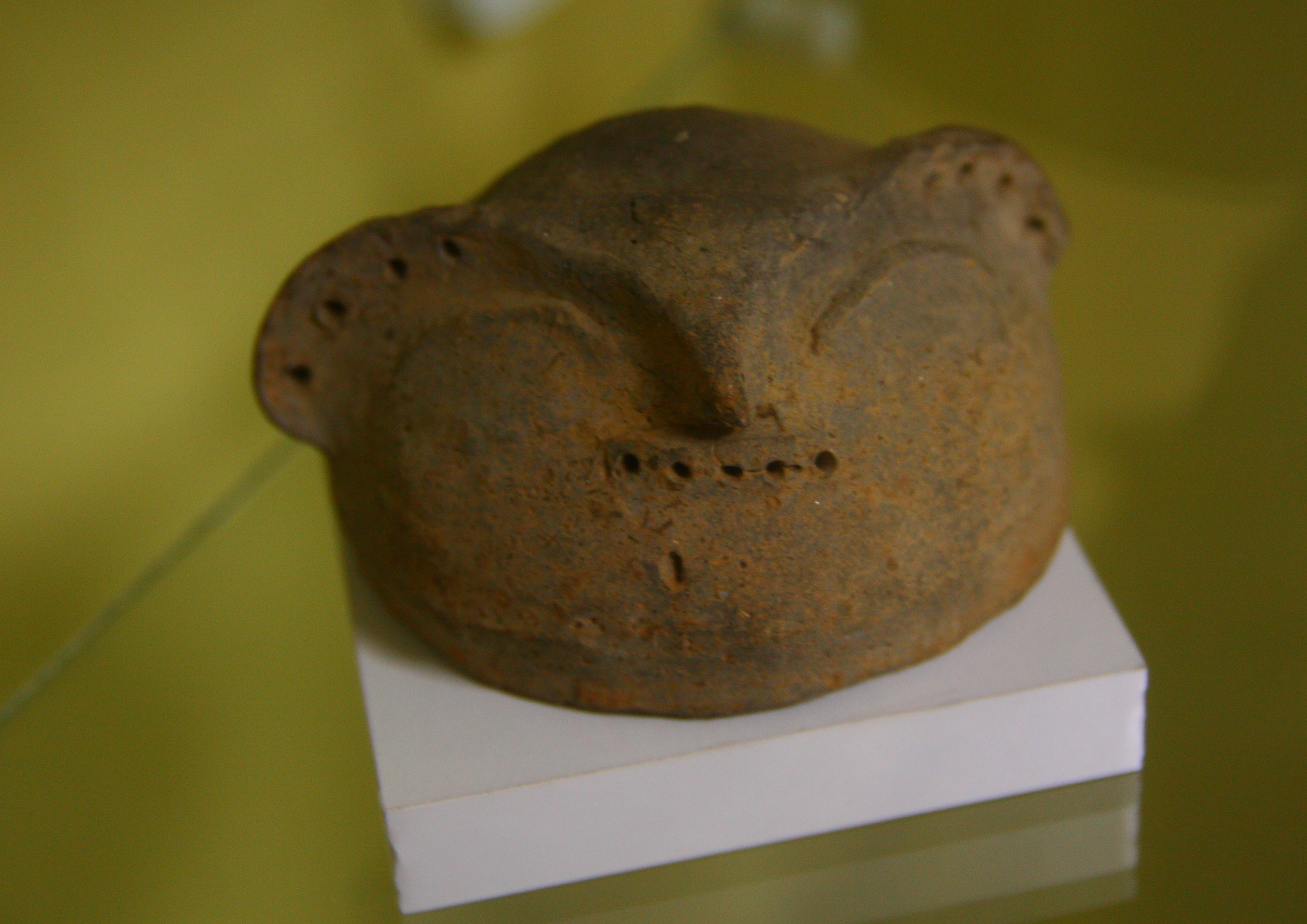

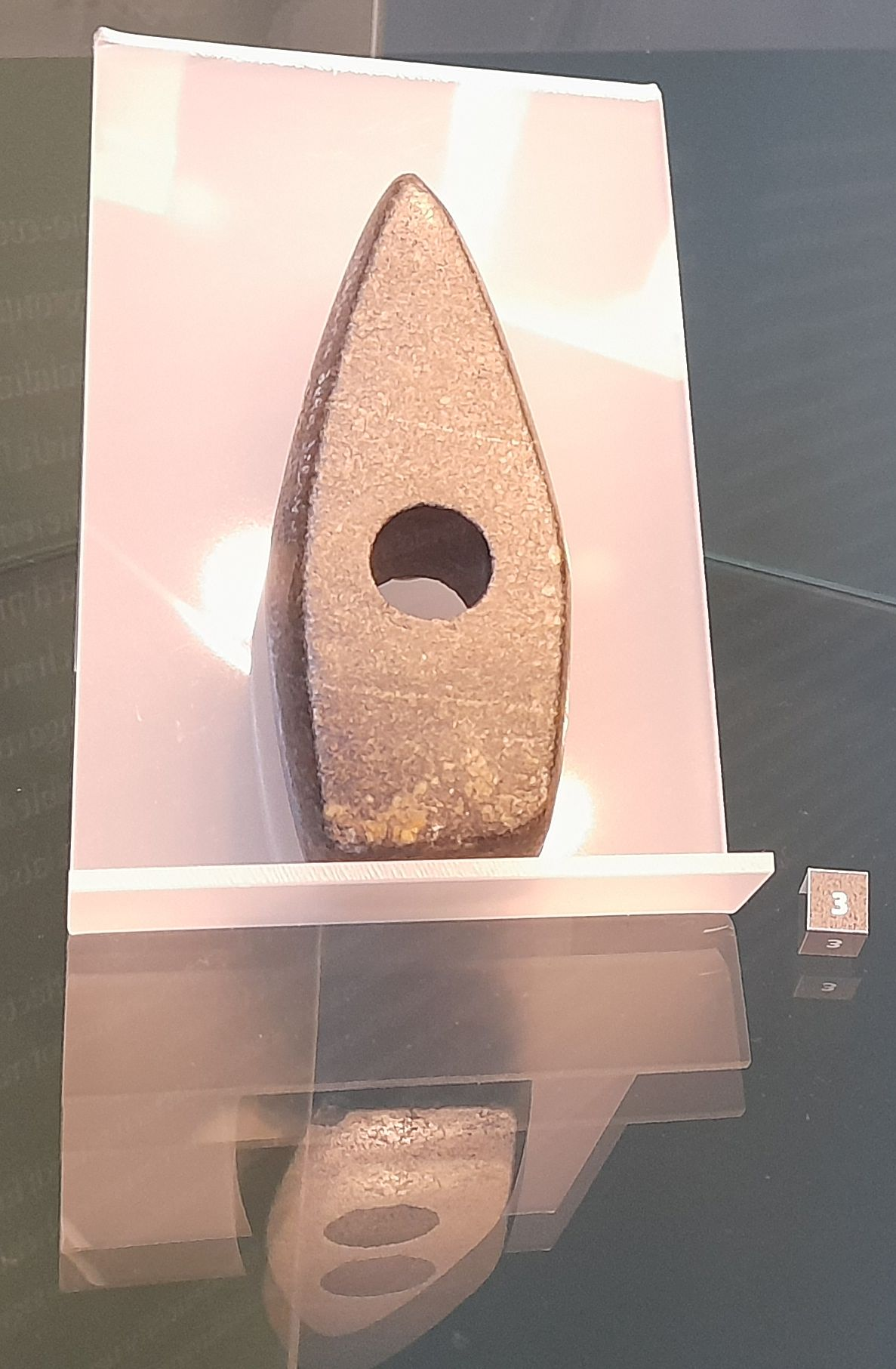

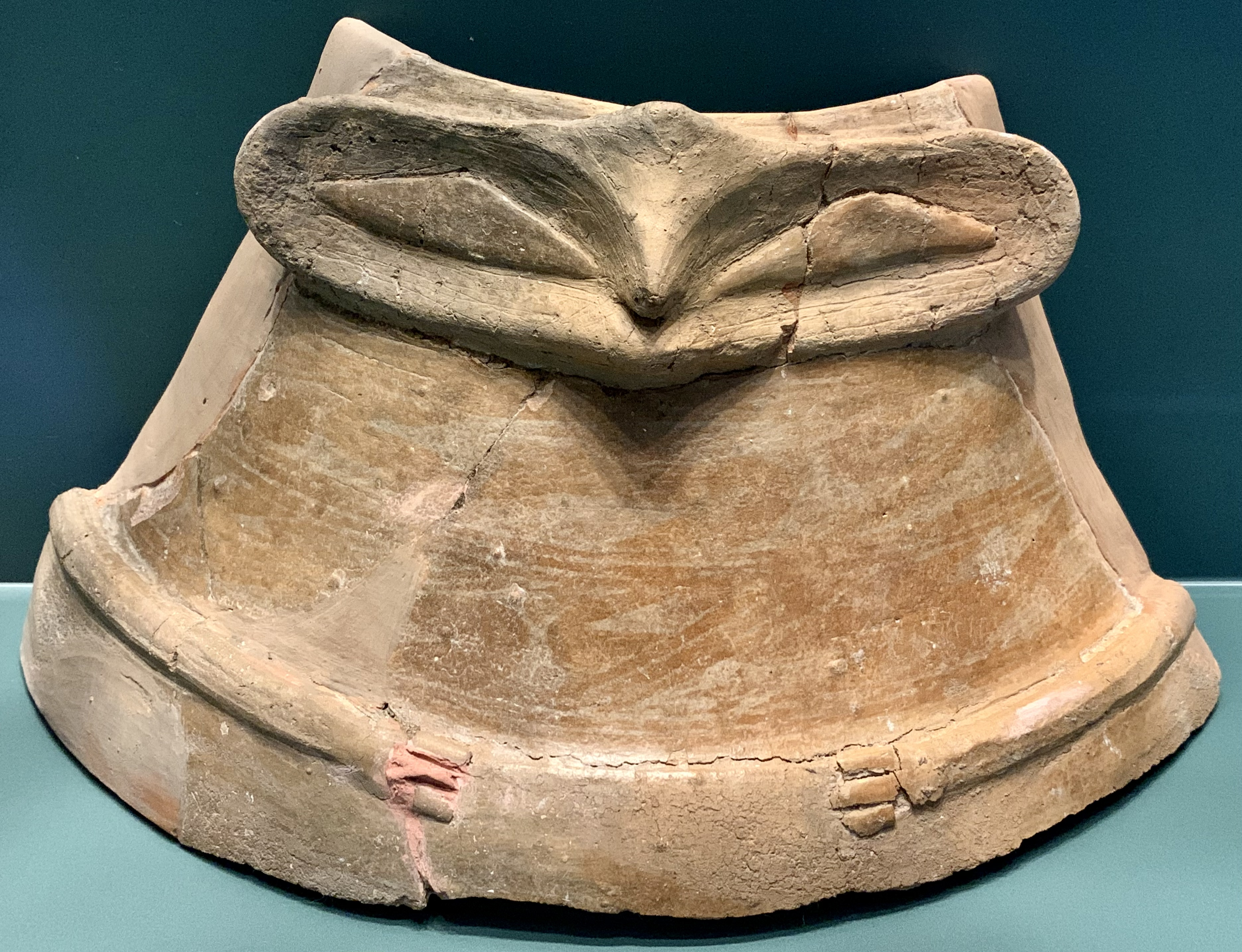

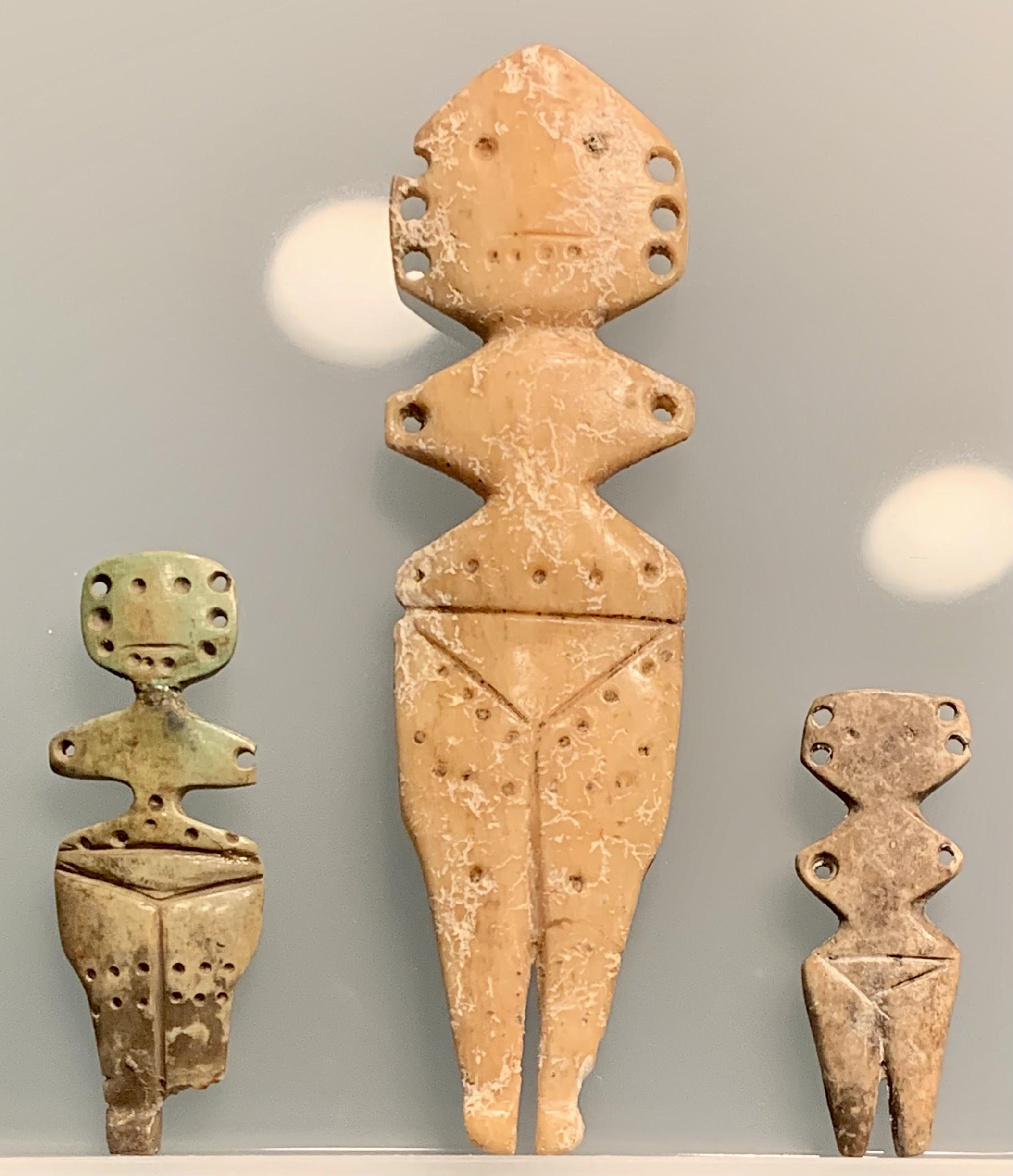

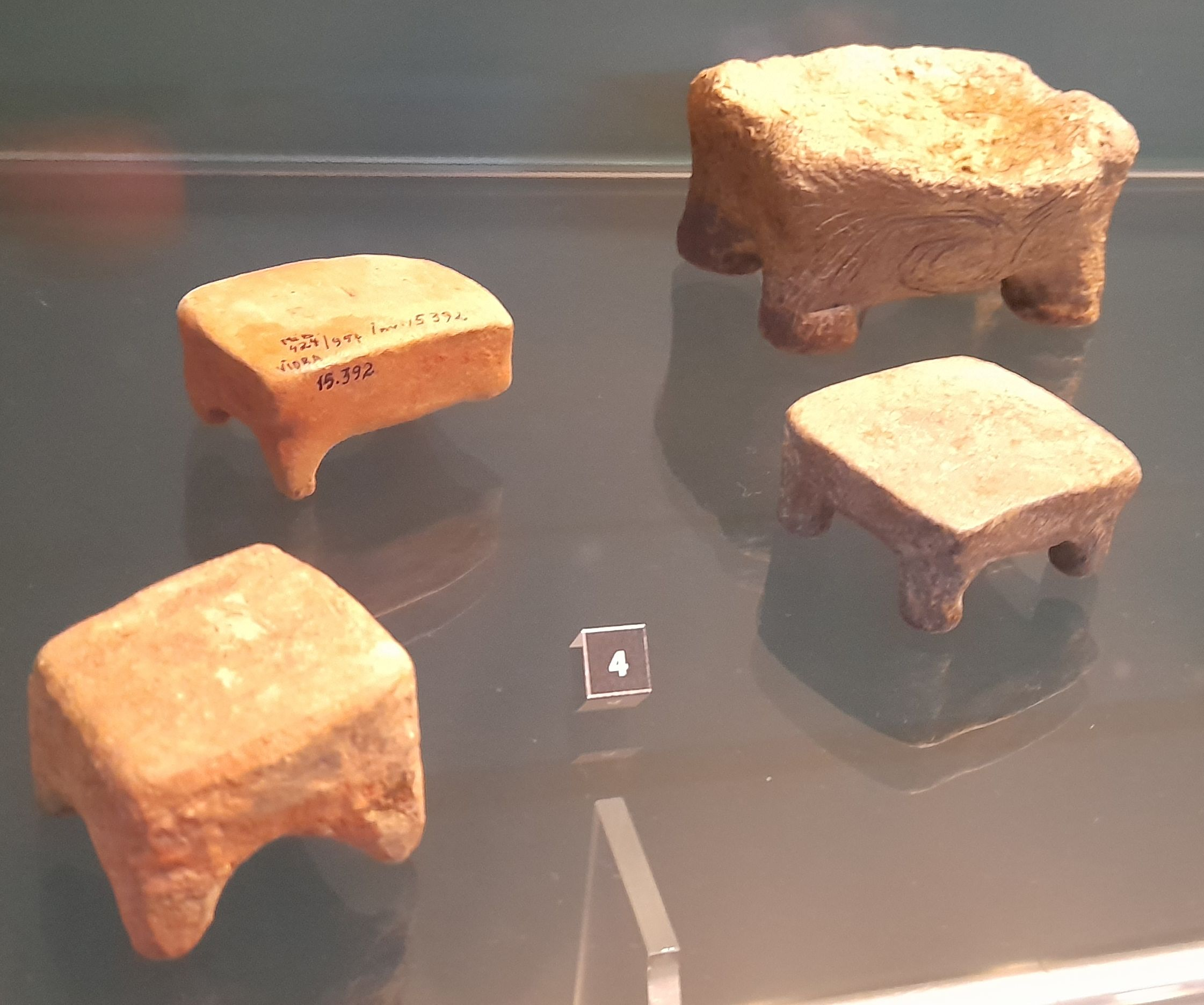

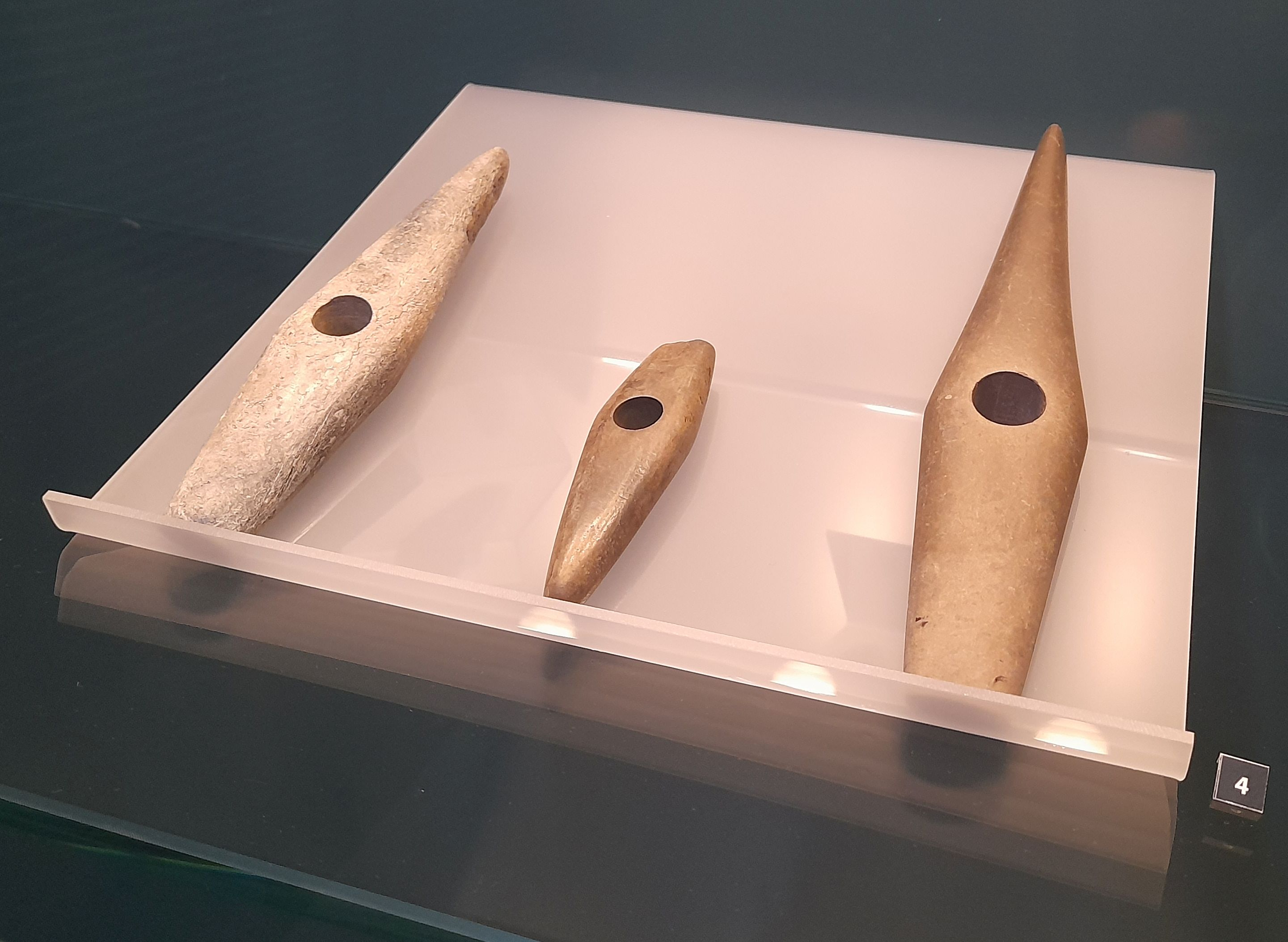

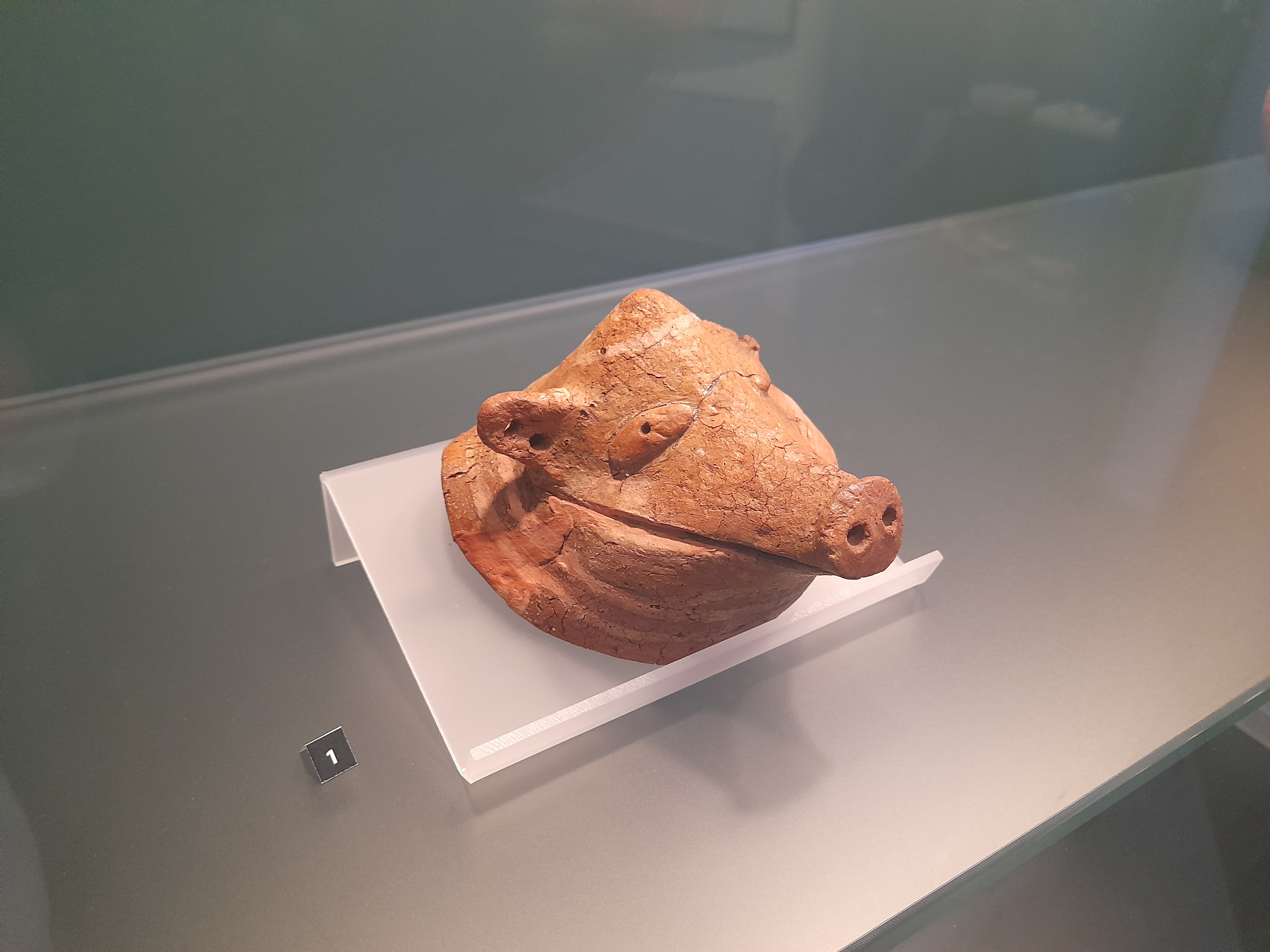

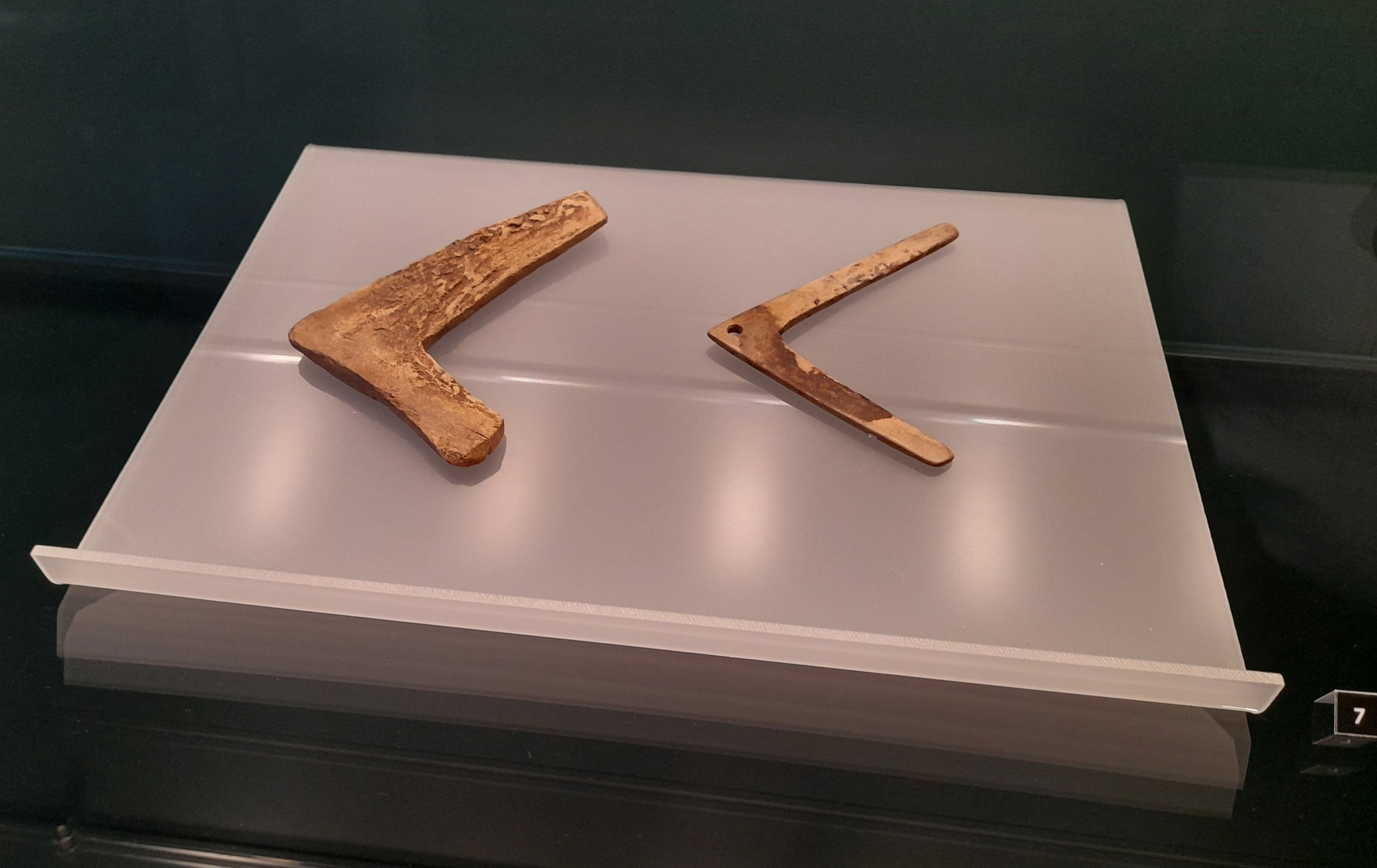

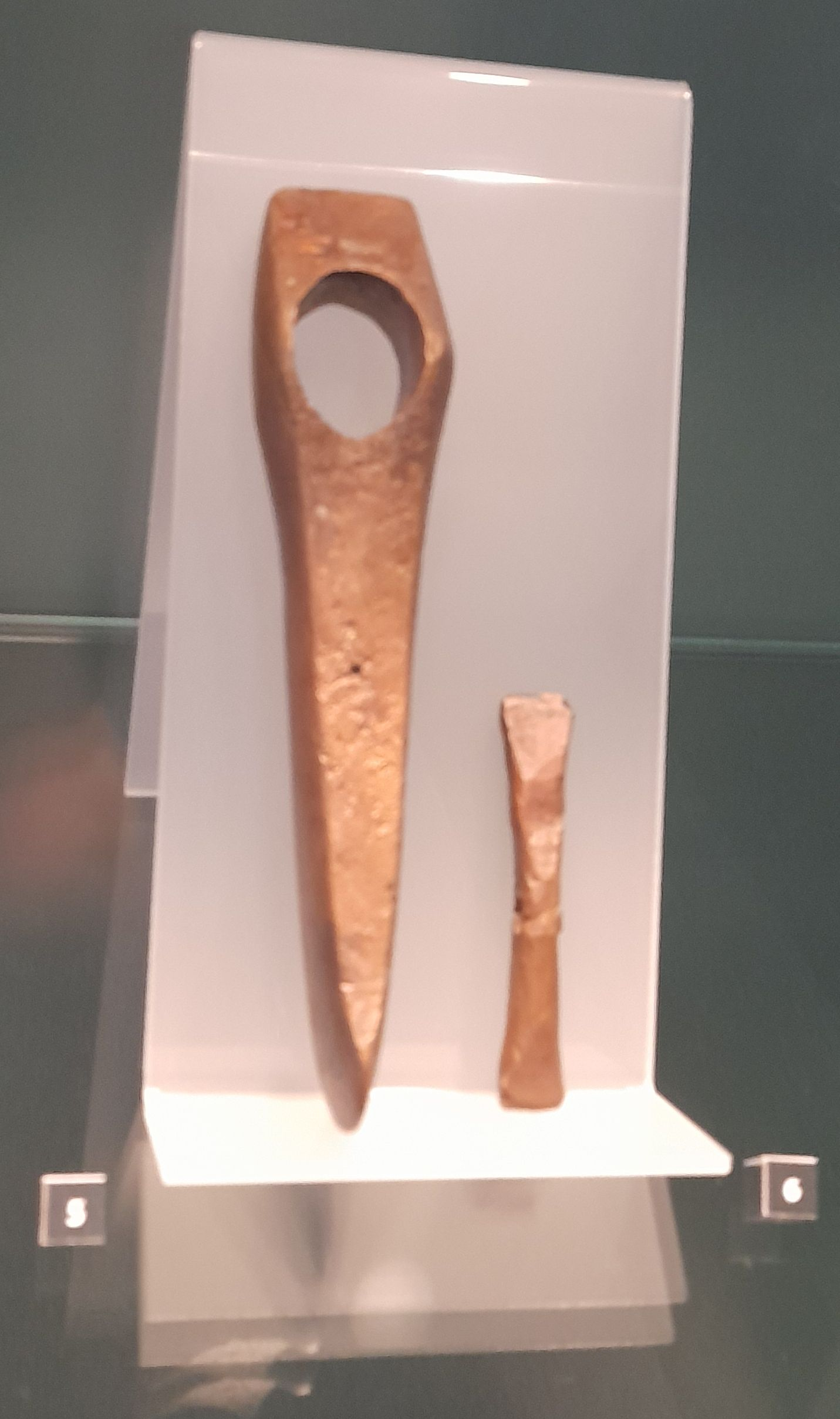
Copper axe

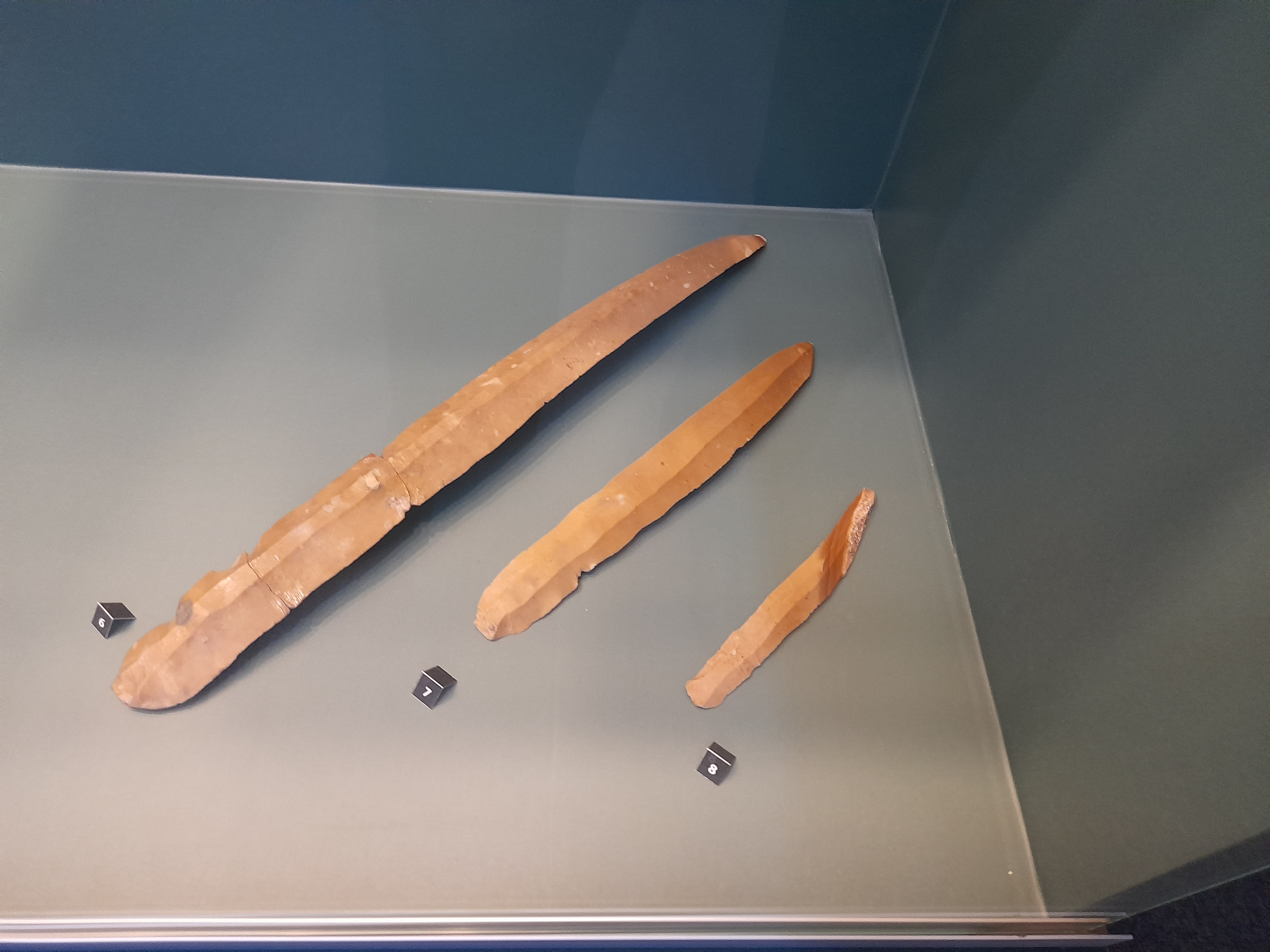

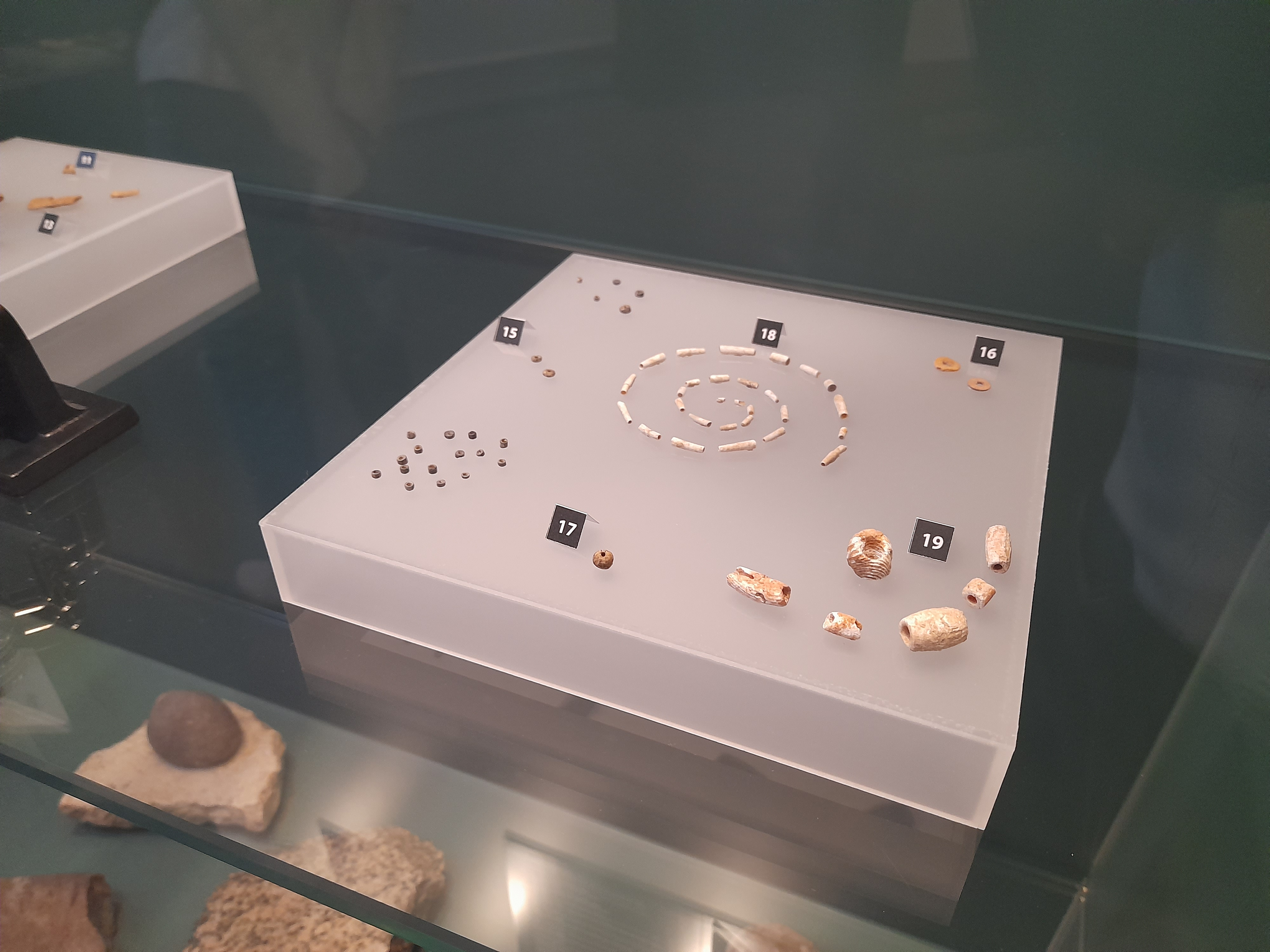

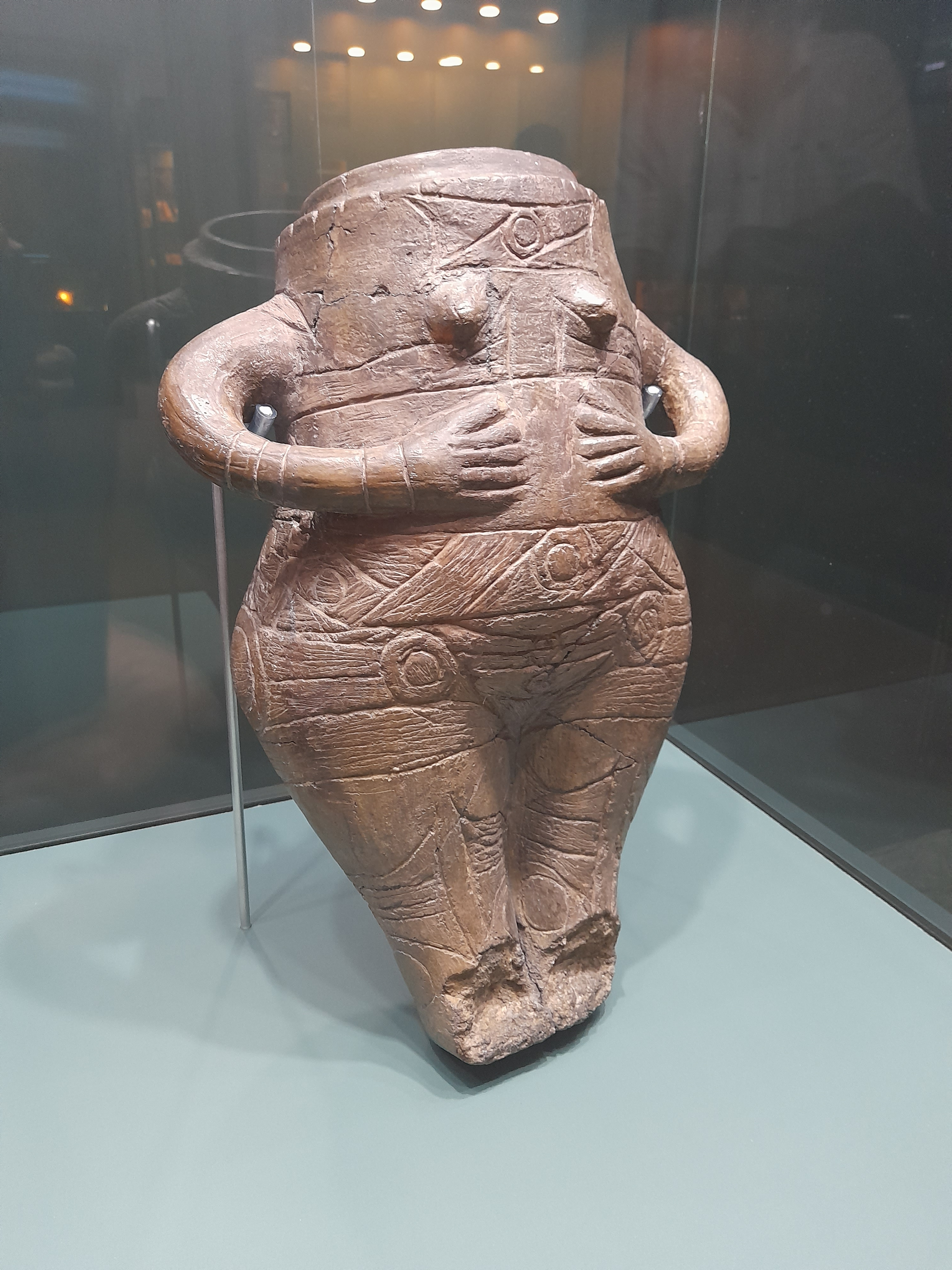

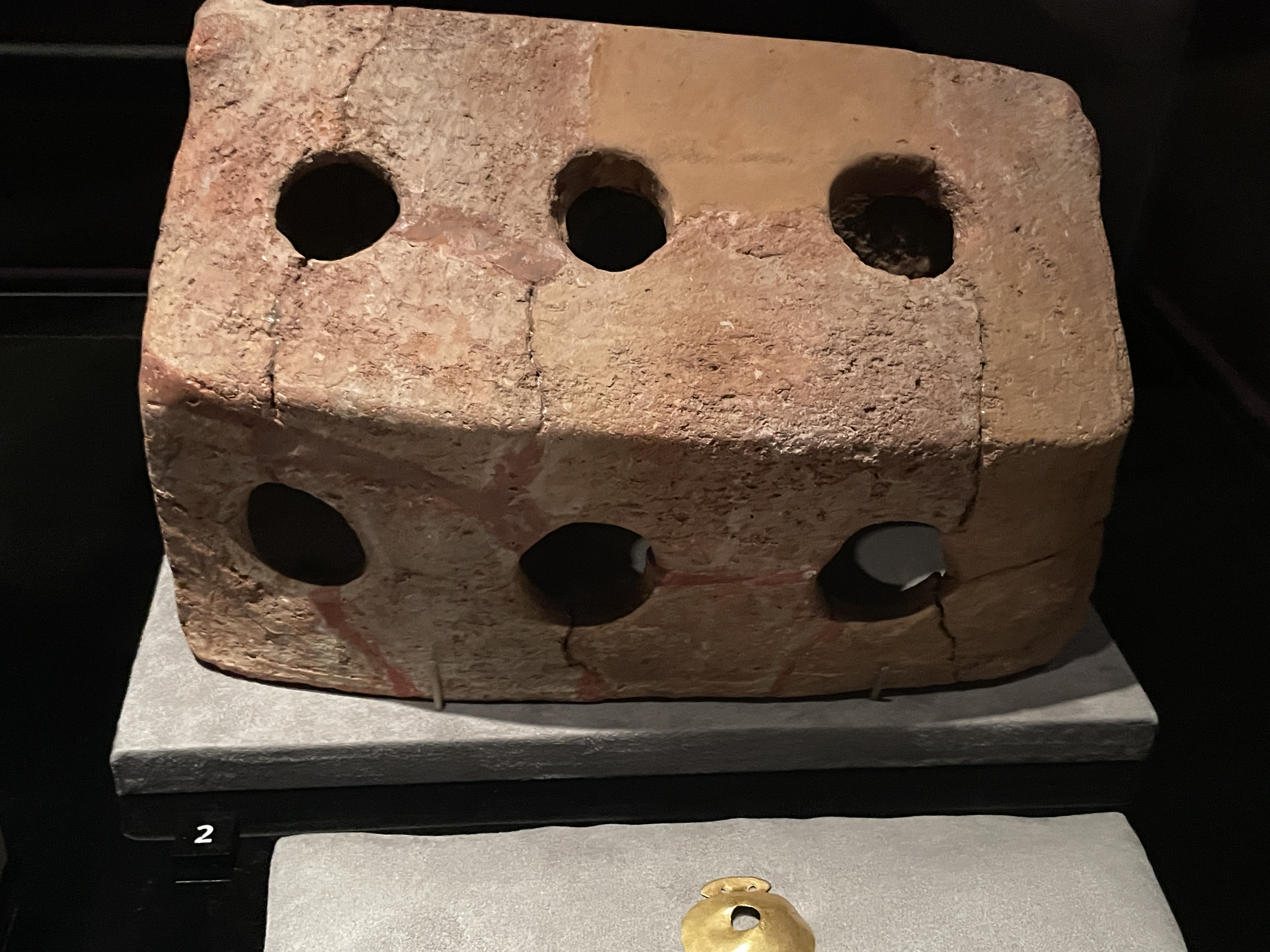
Ceramic house model

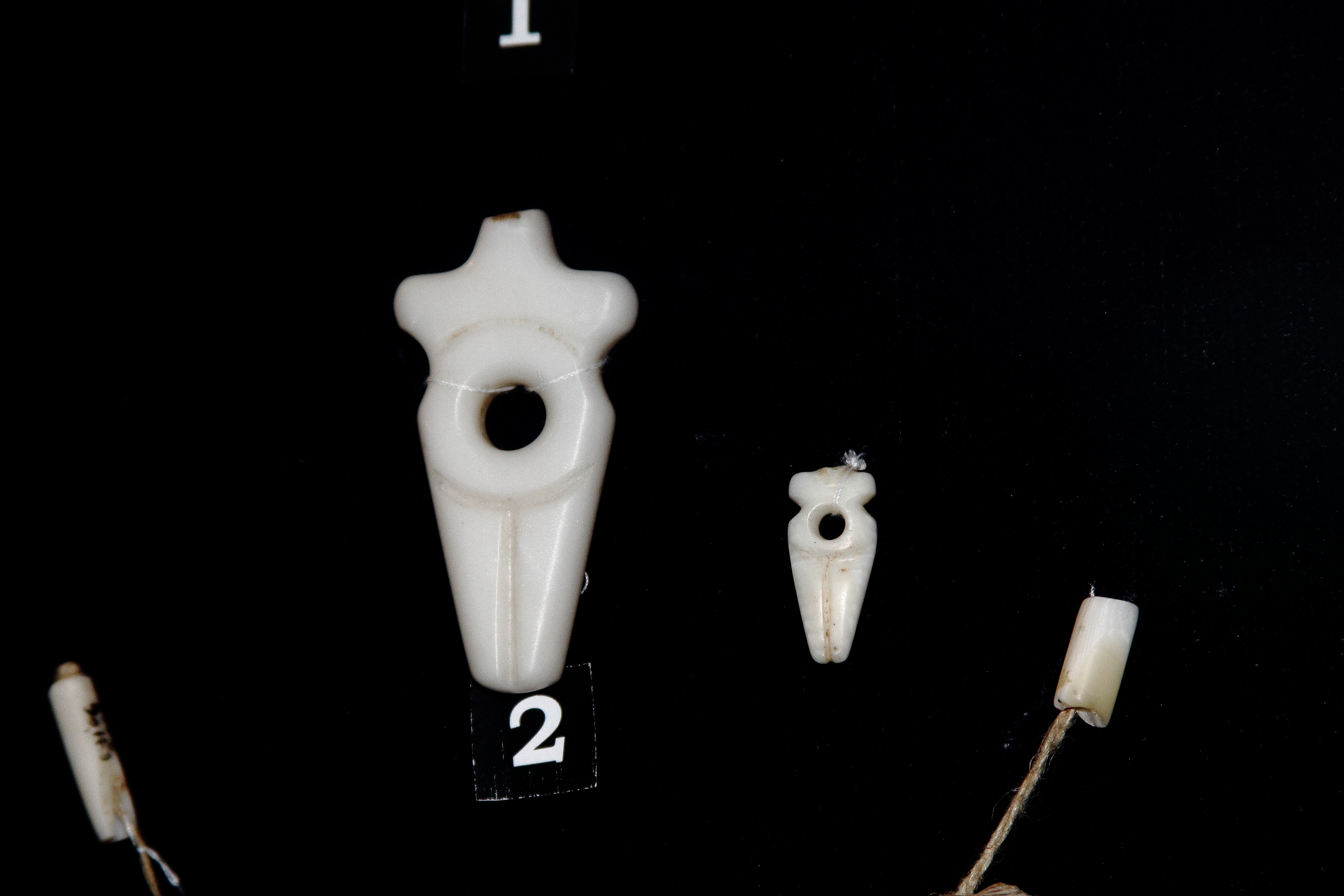

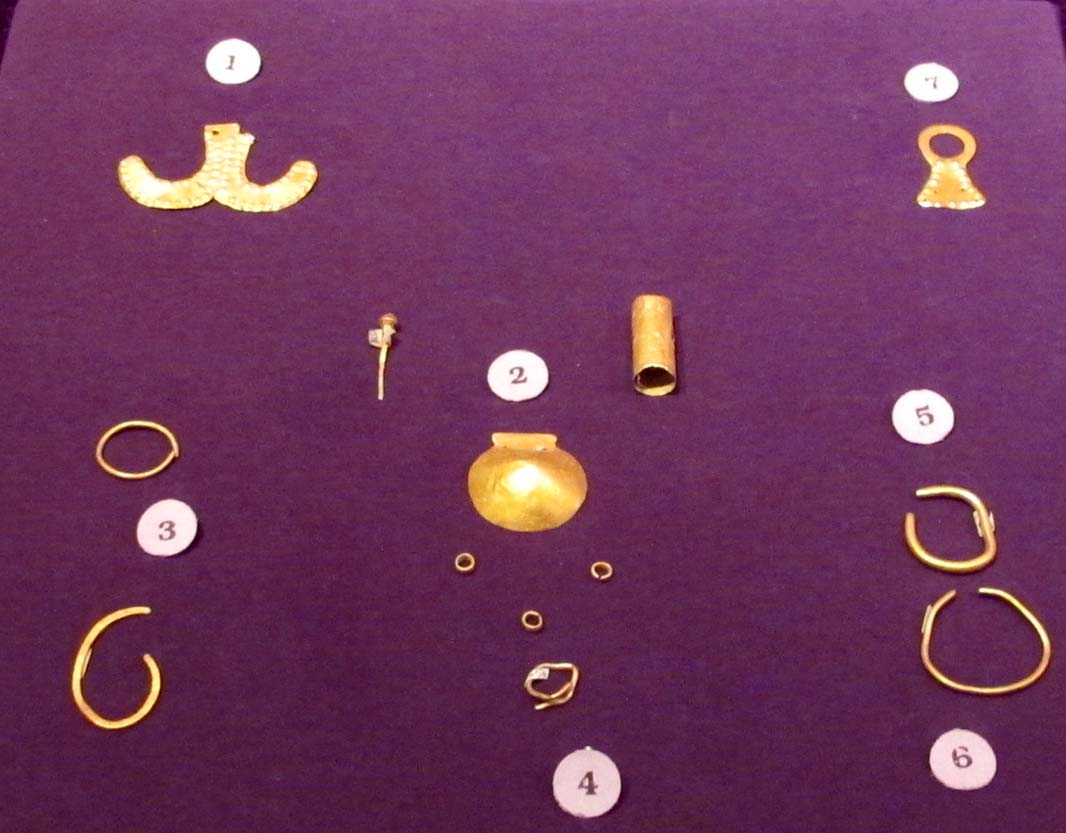
Gold ornaments

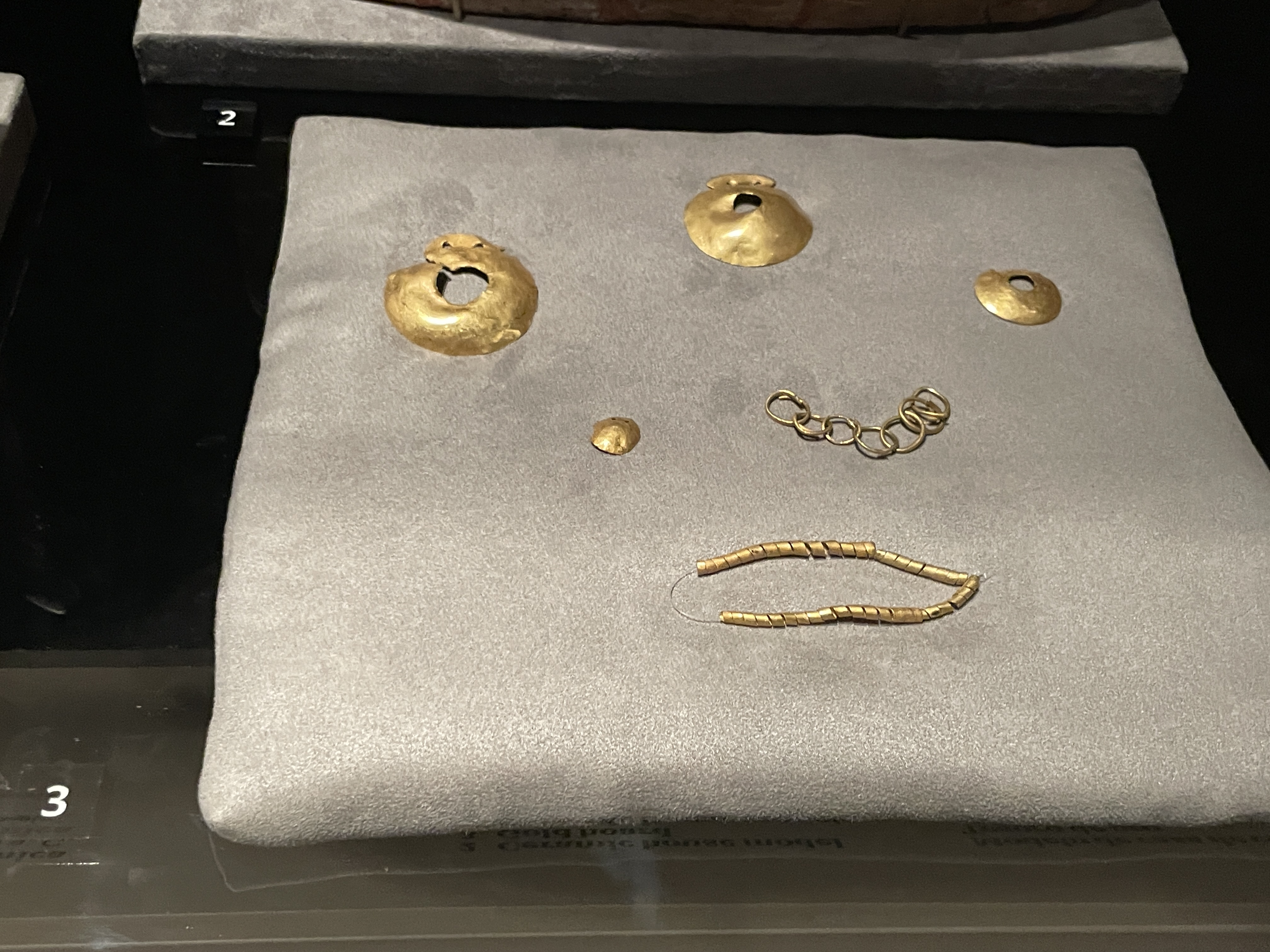
Sultana gold hoard, Romania, c. 4500-4000 BC

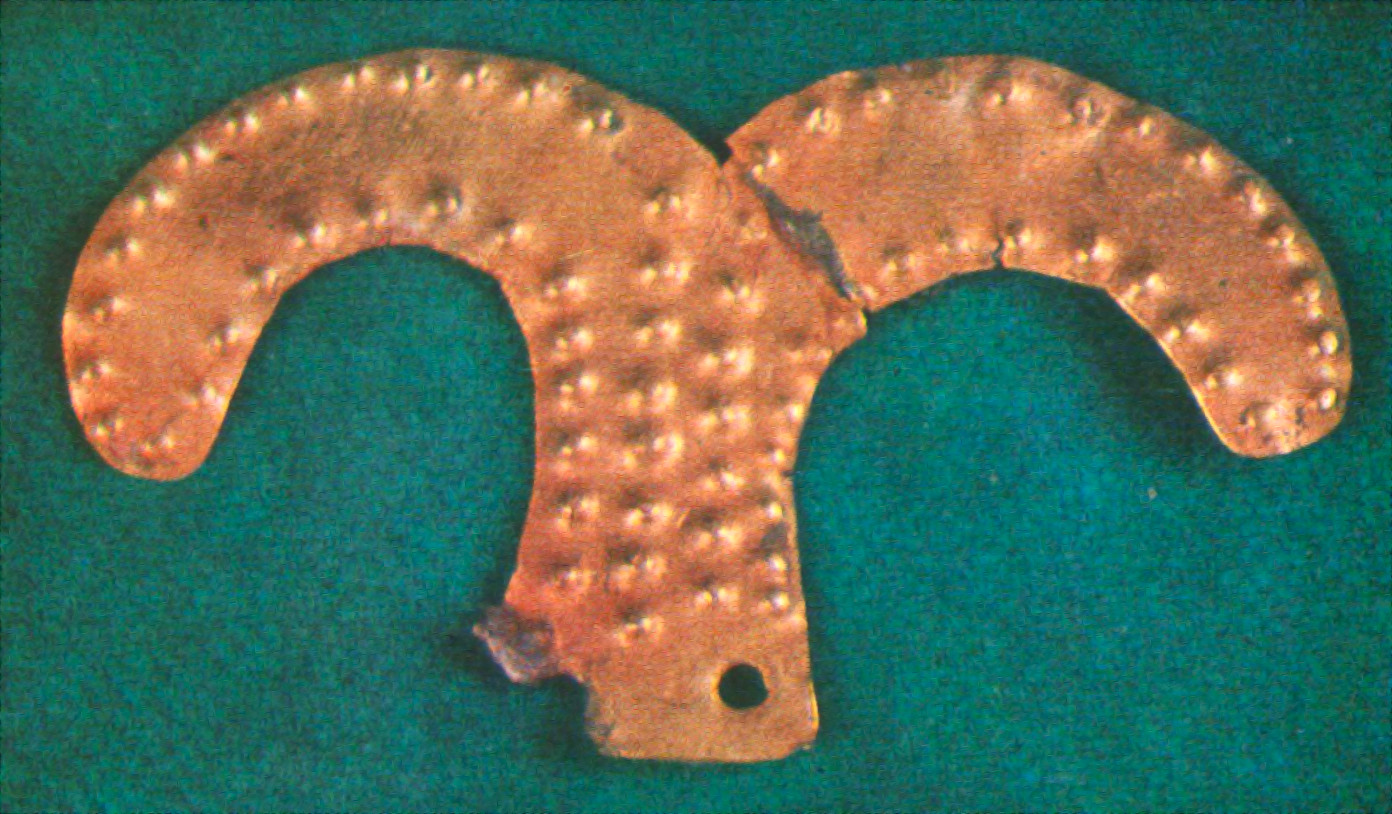
Gold ornament

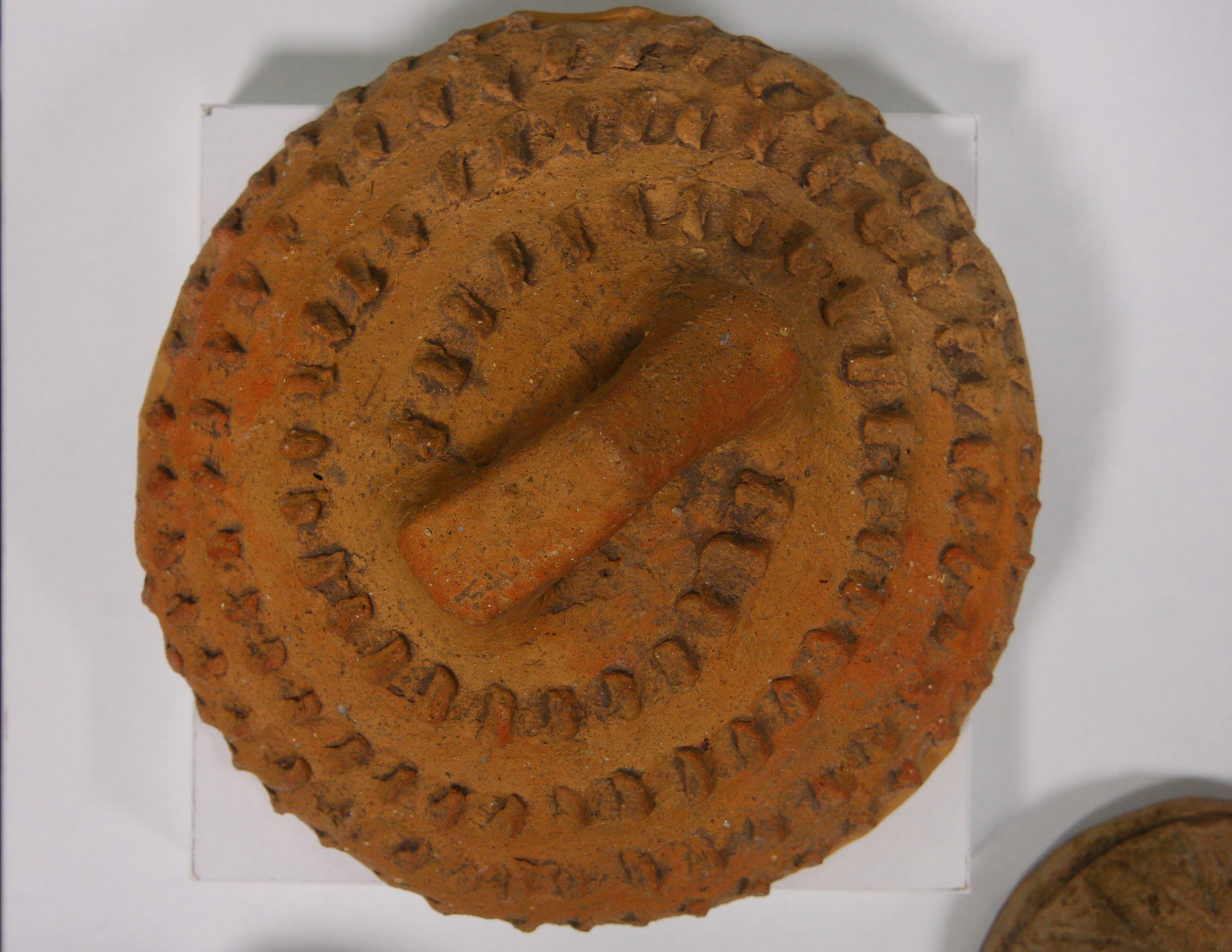
Ceramic container lid

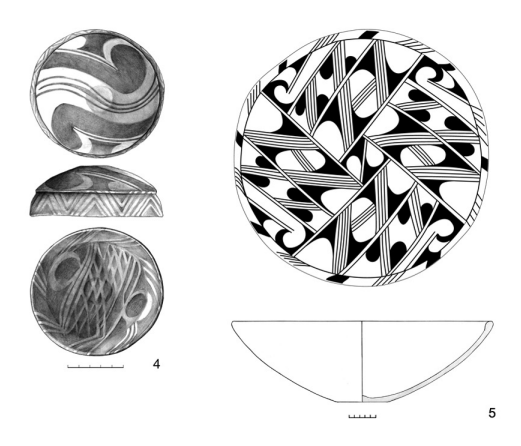
Ceramic designs from Pietrele/Magura

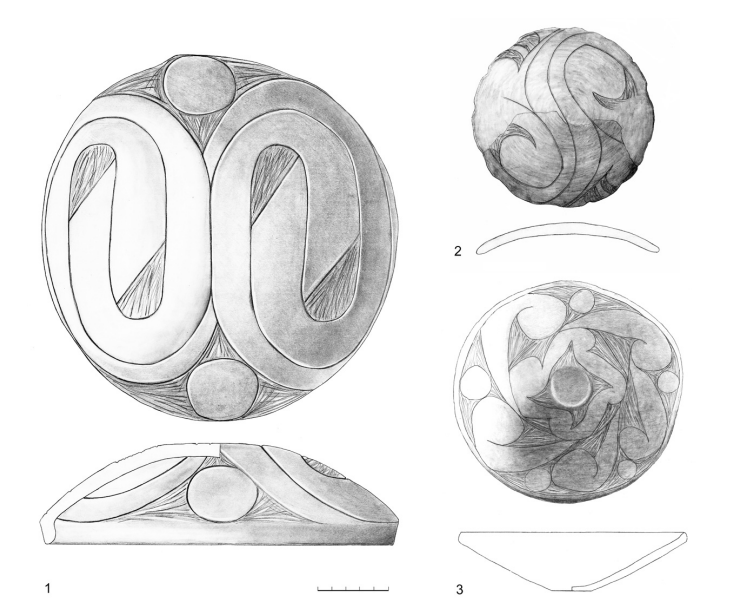
Ceramic designs from Pietrele/Magura

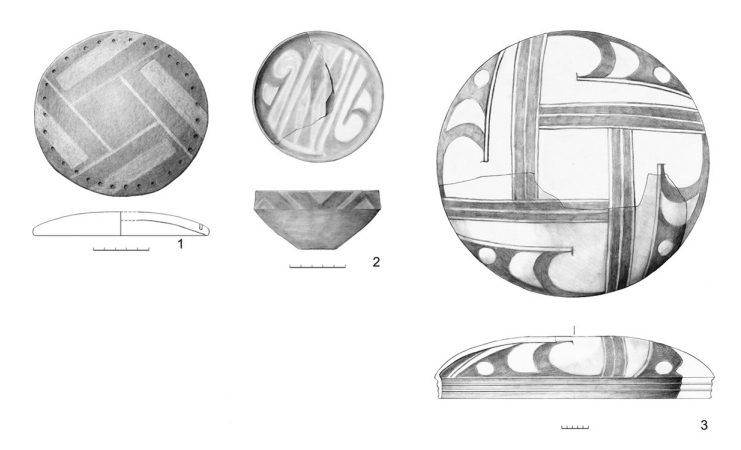
Ceramic designs from Pietrele/Magura

== Technological developments ==
Gumelniţa culture has some sign of work specialisation:

"We do not have enough data on the internal organization of the community, but next to the dwellings themselves, arranged or not in a certain order, we encounter workshop-dwellings for processing lithic material, bones, horns, ornaments, statuettes, etc.)." — Gumelniţa Culture by Silvia Marinescu-Bîlcu

== Danube Script ==
During the Middle Copper Age, the Danube script appears in three horizons: The Gumelniţa–Kodžadermen-Karanovo VI cultural complex (mainly in Bulgaria, but also in Romania), the Cucuteni A3-A4–Trypillya B (in Ukraine), and Coțofeni I (in Serbia). The first, rates 68.6% of the frequencies; the second, rates 24.2%; and the third, rates 7.6%.

== See also ==
- Old Europe
- Karanovo culture
- Vinča culture
- Tărtăria tablets
- Vinča symbols
- Sesklo culture
- Cucuteni–Trypillia culture
- Hamangia culture
- Butmir Culture
- Tisza culture
- Linear Pottery culture
- Lengyel culture
- Funnelbeaker culture

== Bibliography ==
- Stefan Hiller, Vassil Nikolov (eds.), Karanovo III. Beiträge zum Neolithikum in Südosteuropa Österreichisch-Bulgarische Ausgrabungen und Forschungen in Karanovo, Band III, Vienna (2000), ISBN 3-901232-19-2.
