= Dudești culture =

Neolithic archaeological culture

- Period: Neolithic
- Dates: c. 5800 BC – 5000 BC
- Preceded by: Starčevo–Körös–Criș culture
- Followed by: Bolincinyanu culture Vădastra culture Boian culture

The Dudești culture is a farming and herding culture that occupied part of Romania in the 6th millennium BC, typified by semi-subterranean habitations (Zemlyanki) on the edges of low plateaus. This culture contributed to the origin of both the subsequent Hamangia culture and the Boian culture. It was named after Dudești, a quarter in the southeast of Bucharest.

== See also ==
- Prehistoric Romania
- Old Europe (archaeology)
- Prehistoric Europe
