= Rhemaxos =

Dacian king north of the Danube (c. 200 BC)

Rhemaxos was an ancient king who ruled to the north of Danube around 200 BC and who was the protector of the Greek colonies in Dobruja, receiving a tribute from them in exchange of protection against outside attacks. It appears that the links with the Greek cities lasted a rather long time, as several treaties have been found.

Some historians have suggested that he was the chieftain of a Dacian tribal union on the Romanian Plain. Others said he was a Scythian king.

His son Phradmon allocated 600 horsemen to defend the city of Histria at the request of Agathocles, son of Antiphilos.
