= Moskon =

3rd-century BC Thracian Getic king

Moskon was a Getic king who ruled in the 3rd century BC the northern parts of Dobruja, probably being the head of a local tribal union, which had close relations with the local Greek colonies and adopted the Greek style of administration.

His existence is proven by silver coins found near Tulcea, all of them featuring the head of a young man with long hair and a tiara and a horseman on the reverse, with the writing ΒΑΣΙΛΕΩΣ ΜΟΣΚΩΝΟΣ, Basileos Moskonos, i.e. King Moskon.
