= Neolithic Italy =

Italian Peninsula during the Neolithic

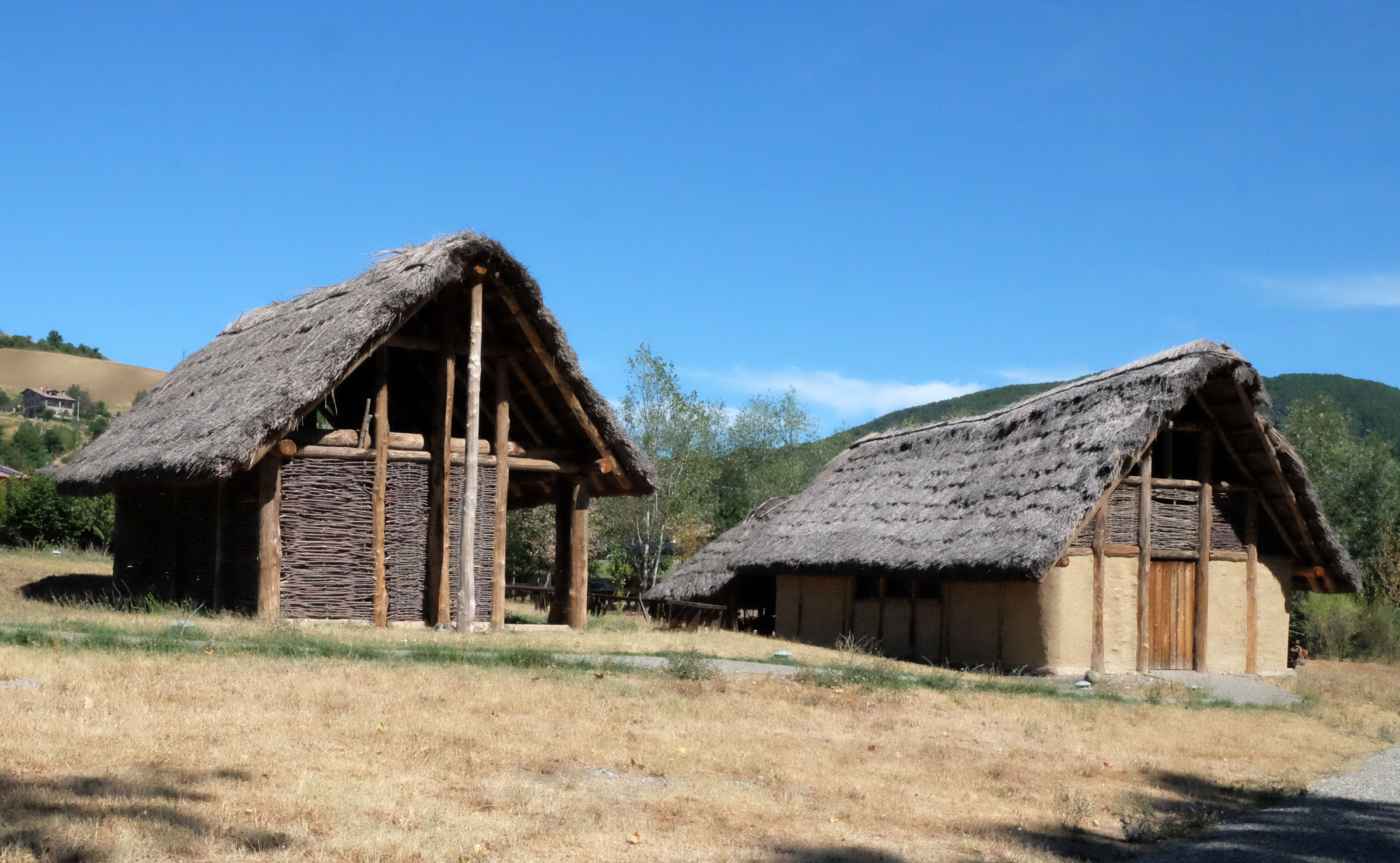
Reconstruction of the Neolithic village of Travo

Neolithic Italy refers to the period that spanned from circa 6000 BCE, when Neolithic influences from the east reached the Italian Peninsula and the surrounding island bringing the Neolithic Revolution, to circa 3500-3000 BCE, when metallurgy began to spread.

== Early Neolithic ==
=== The neolithization of Italy ===
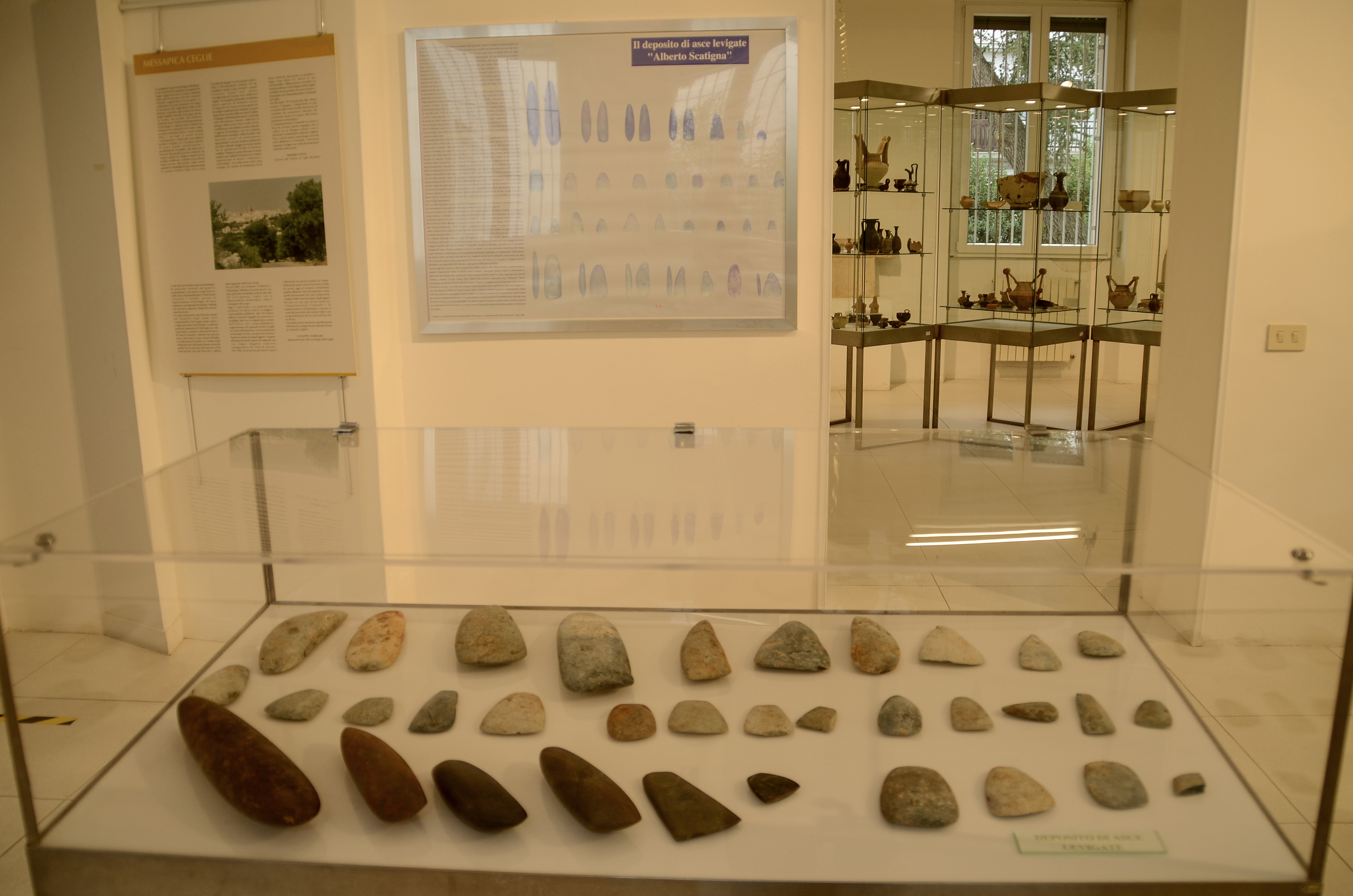
MAAC Museum - Neolithic axes from Ceglie Messapica

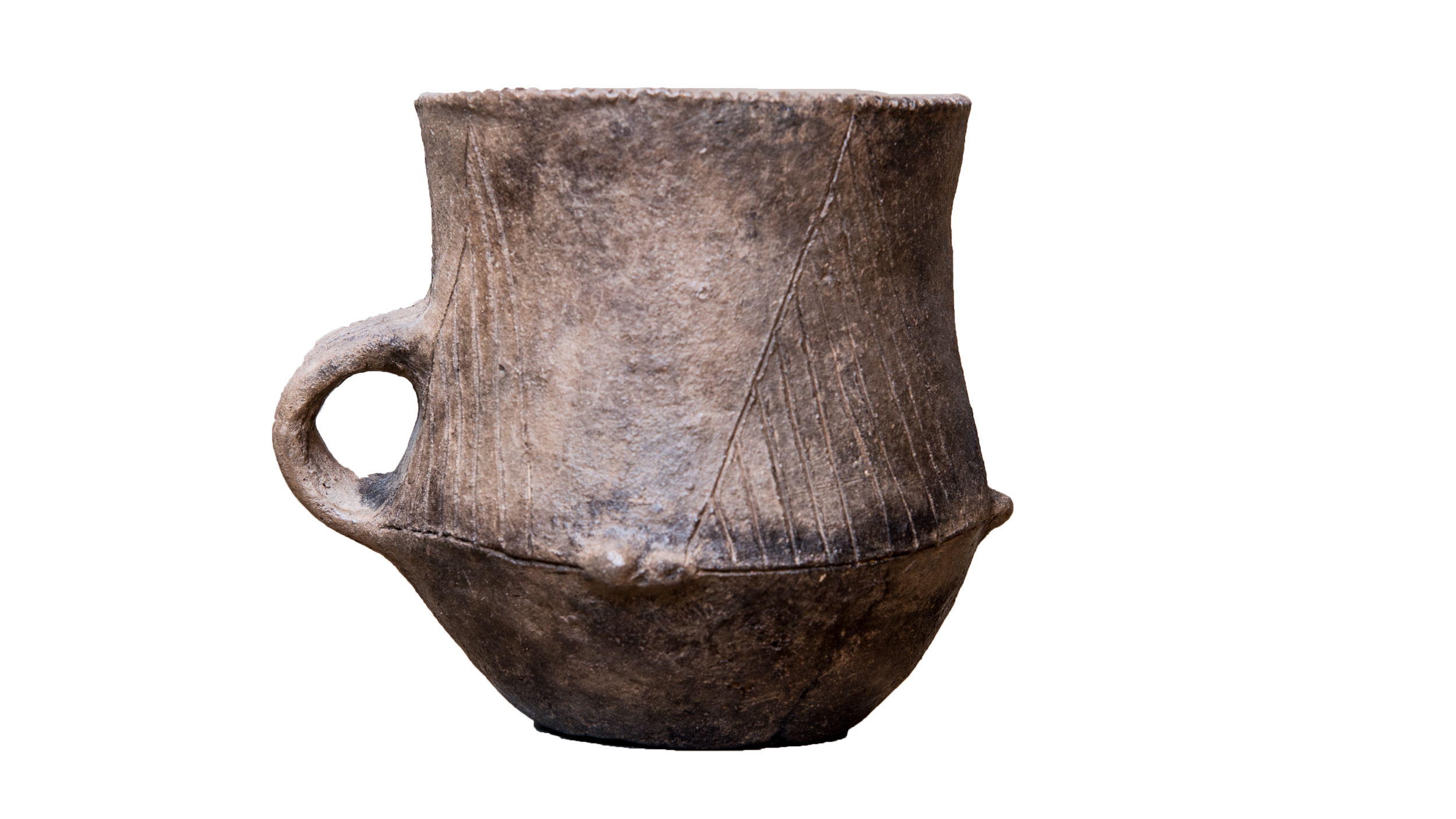
Incised pottery from Friuli

In the Western Mediterranean region the first wave of neolithization came by sea, with the spread of the Cardium pottery (or Impressed Ware), decorated with impressions mainly obtained through the shell of the genus Cardium (hence the nickname cardial ceramic), on all the coasts of Western Mediterranean, from Liguria, to southern France and Spain. Central Europe was instead hit by another, related but different, wave that went up the Danube, bringing the Linear Pottery (Linienbandkeramik). The meeting between the farmers and the European Mesolithic communities produced many regional variations of the two main strands of Impressed pottery and Linear Pottery.

In Southern Italy the impressed pottery Neolithic culture spread, between the second half of the sixth millennium BC and the beginning of V, especially in the Tavoliere delle Puglie, Irpinia and Basilicata, from where it spread to the north and the interior and the Tyrrhenian coast. In Sicily there was more continuity with the local Mesolithic communities. The island of Lipari was colonized at the beginning of the fifth millennium BC by people coming from Sicily for the exploitation of its deposits of obsidian.

In Central Italy the presence of the Apennines caused the formation of different regional horizons on the Tyrrhenian side and on the Adriatic one, with different cultural facies that succeeded each other with some overlaps. In Sardinia, the exploitation of the obsidian deposits of the Monte Arci led to the early development of the Neolithic cultures, introduced with the culture of the impressed pottery in the early sixth millennium BC.

In Northern Italy a variant of the Impressed Ware, established himself on the Ligurian coast in the first half of the sixth millennium BC. While in the process of neolithization of Northwest Italy occurs through influences of the Ligurian Impressed Ware, in Romagna the facies of the Adriatic Impressed Ceramic spread around the middle of the fifth millennium BC thanks to the contribution of the connected groups of the Abruzzo-Marche Impressed Ware. At the end of the millennium the area of the Po Valley was subdivided by a mosaic of cultures united by the ceramic decoration. At the beginning of the fifth millennium BC the former cultural mosaic was replaced by the culture of the square mouthed vases, widespread from Liguria to Veneto.

== Middle Neolithic ==
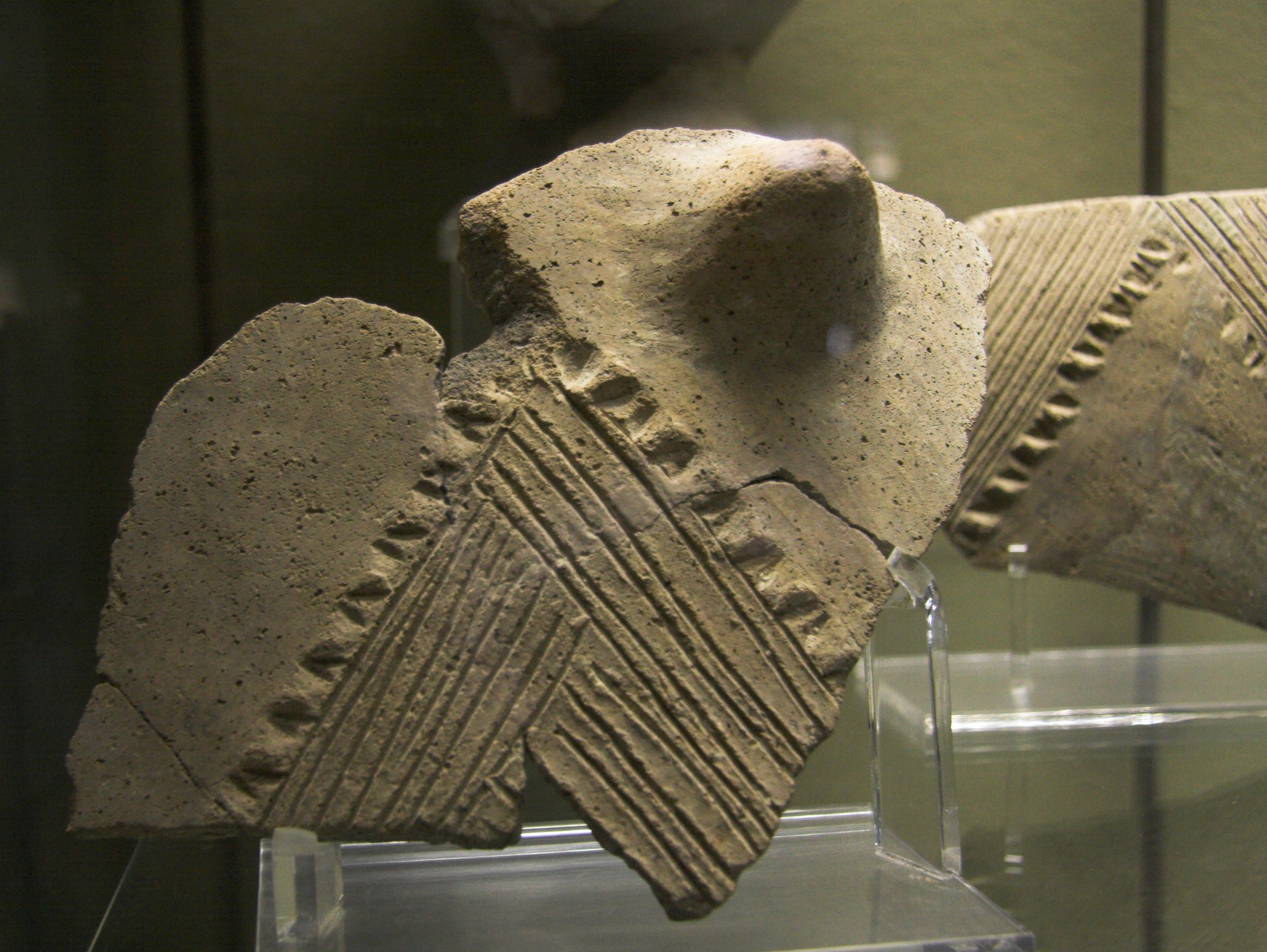
Pottery fragment of the Stentinello culture

=== Southern Italy ===
Middle Neolithic archaeological cultures
Passo di Corvo facies
Scaloria Bassa facies
Capri-Lipari-Scaloria Alta facies
Serra d'Alto facies

=== Sicily ===
Middle Neolithic archaeological cultures
Stentinello culture
Capri-Lipari-Scaloria Alta facies
Serra d'Alto facies

=== Central Italy ===
Middle Neolithic archaeological cultures
Catignano culture
Linear Ceramic culture

=== Sardinia ===
Middle Neolithic archaeological cultures
Bonu Ighinu culture

=== Northern Italy ===
Middle Neolithic archaeological cultures
Square Mouthed Vases culture

== Late Neolithic ==
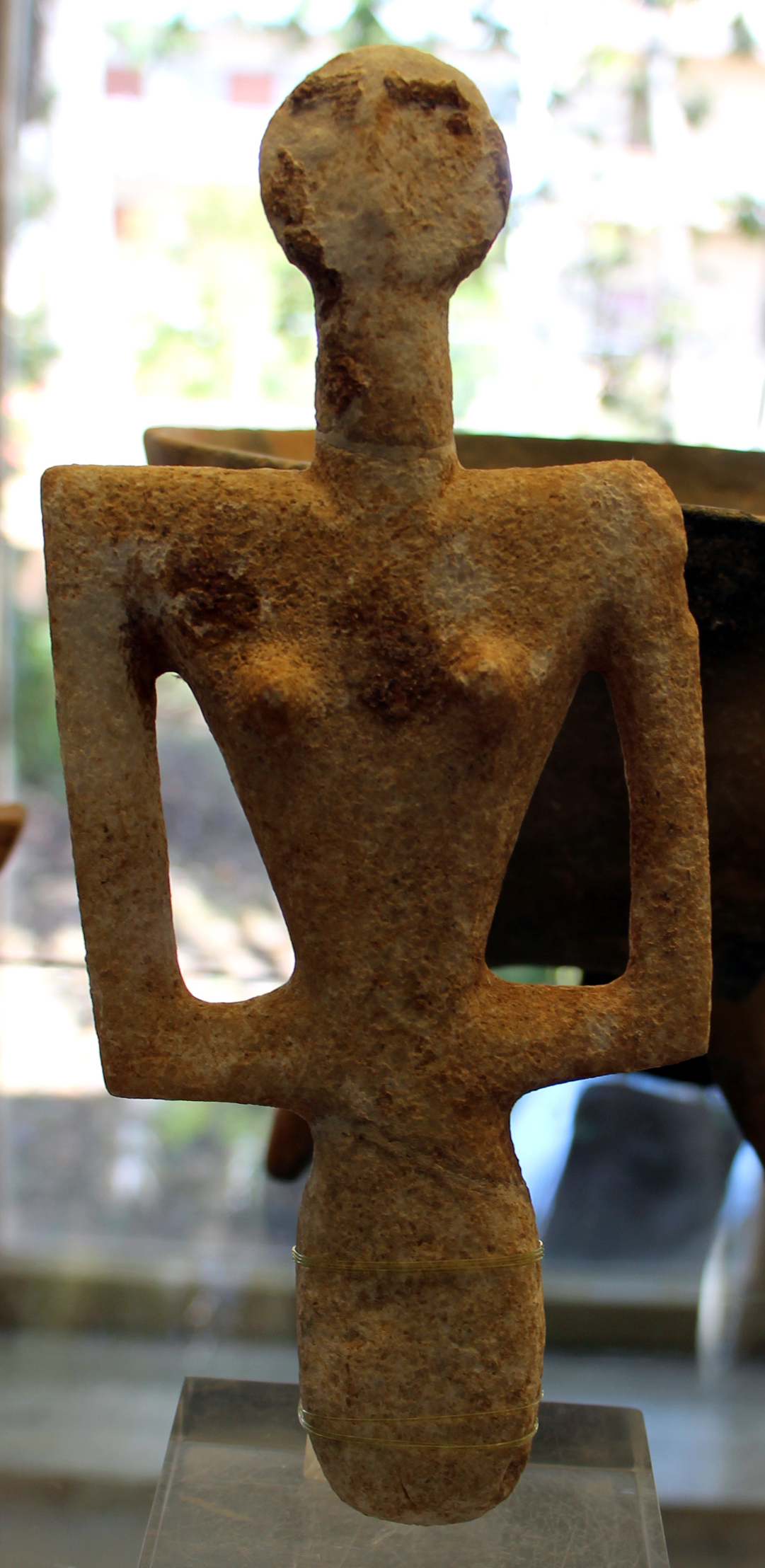
Statuette of the Ozieri culture

=== Southern Italy ===
Late Neolithic archaeological cultures
Serra d'Alto acromo style
Diana-Bellavista style

=== Sicily ===
Late Neolithic archaeological cultures
Diana culture

=== Central Italy ===
Late Neolithic archaeological cultures
Ripoli culture
Chassey, Late Diana Ripoli culture

=== Sardinia ===
Late Neolithic archaeological cultures
San Ciriaco culture
Arzachena culture
Ozieri culture

=== Northern Italy ===
Late Neolithic archaeological cultures
Ligurian Chassey facies
Lagozza culture
Late Diana Ripoli culture

== Economy ==
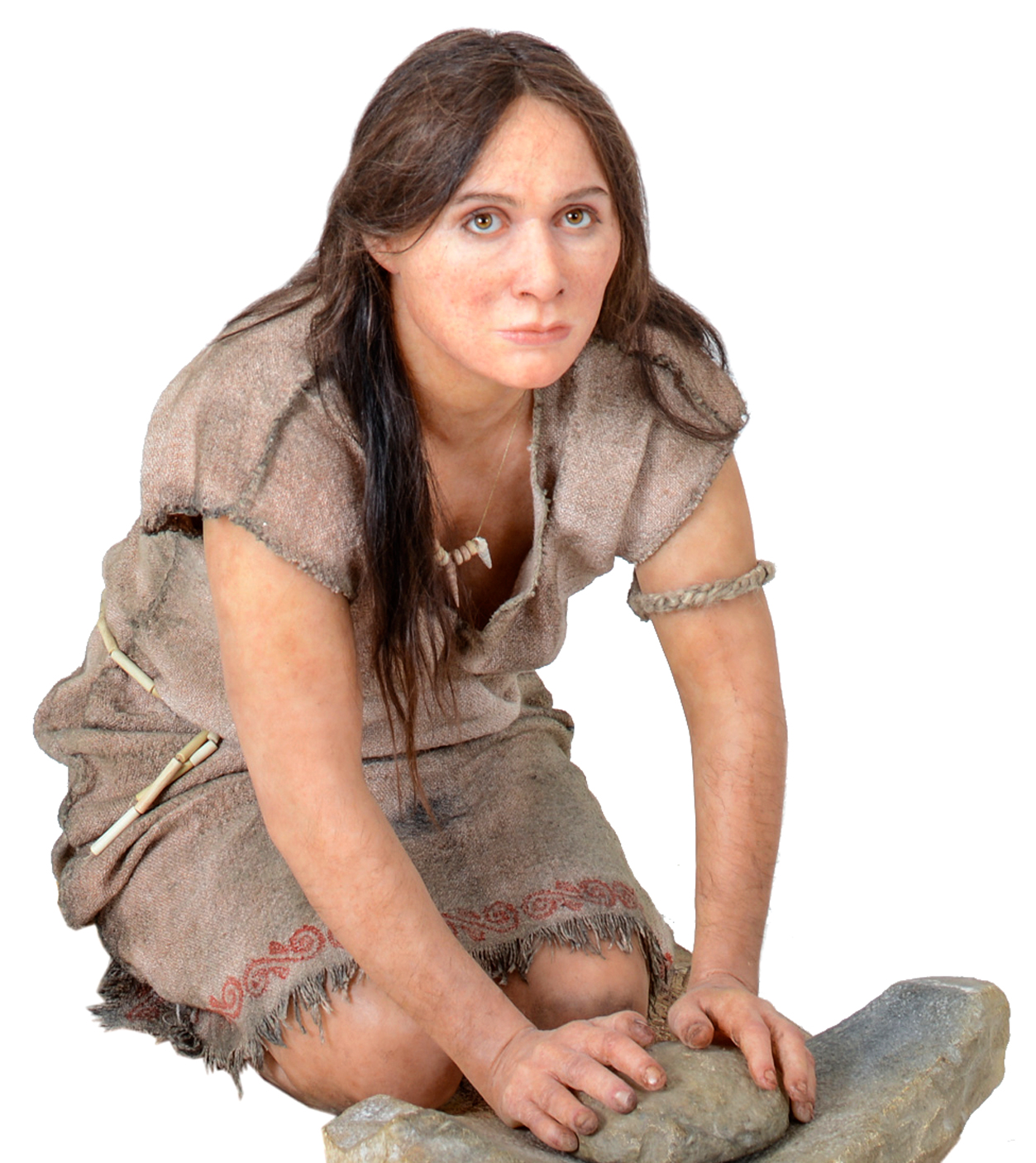
Reconstruction of a Neolithic woman, Trento science museum

From the middle of the sixth millennium BC the Neolithic groups in Italy began a wider exploitation of local resources: they developed the domestication of wild species, such as cattle and pigs, with a "mixed" economy between agriculture (attested by the presence of mills, grinders and sickles) and livestock in predominantly permanent settlements. However hunting, fishing and shellfishing were still important activities.

Obsidian, valuable raw material for the making of tools, played a major role in the trades of the neolithic communities; the most important deposits were located in Sardinia (Monte Arci), at Lipari, Pantelleria and Palmarola. From there it was exported in the Italian Peninsula but also in Southern France and in North Africa.

== Religion ==
Late in the last phase of the Neolithic period in Sardinia and Val d'Aosta appeared new religious ideologies related to the introduction of megalithism from the west.

== See also ==
- Neolithic Europe
- Pre-Nuragic Sardinia
- Prehistoric Italy

== Bibliography ==
- AA.VV., Guida della Preistoria italiana, Sansoni, Firenze 1975
- Cocchi Genick D., Manuale di Preistoria, Neolitico, volume II, Octavo, Firenze 1994
- Guidi A. - Piperno M. (a cura di), Italia preistorica, Laterza, Roma-Bari 1992
