= Neolithic Europe =

Era of prehistory prior to Copper & Bronze ages in each region

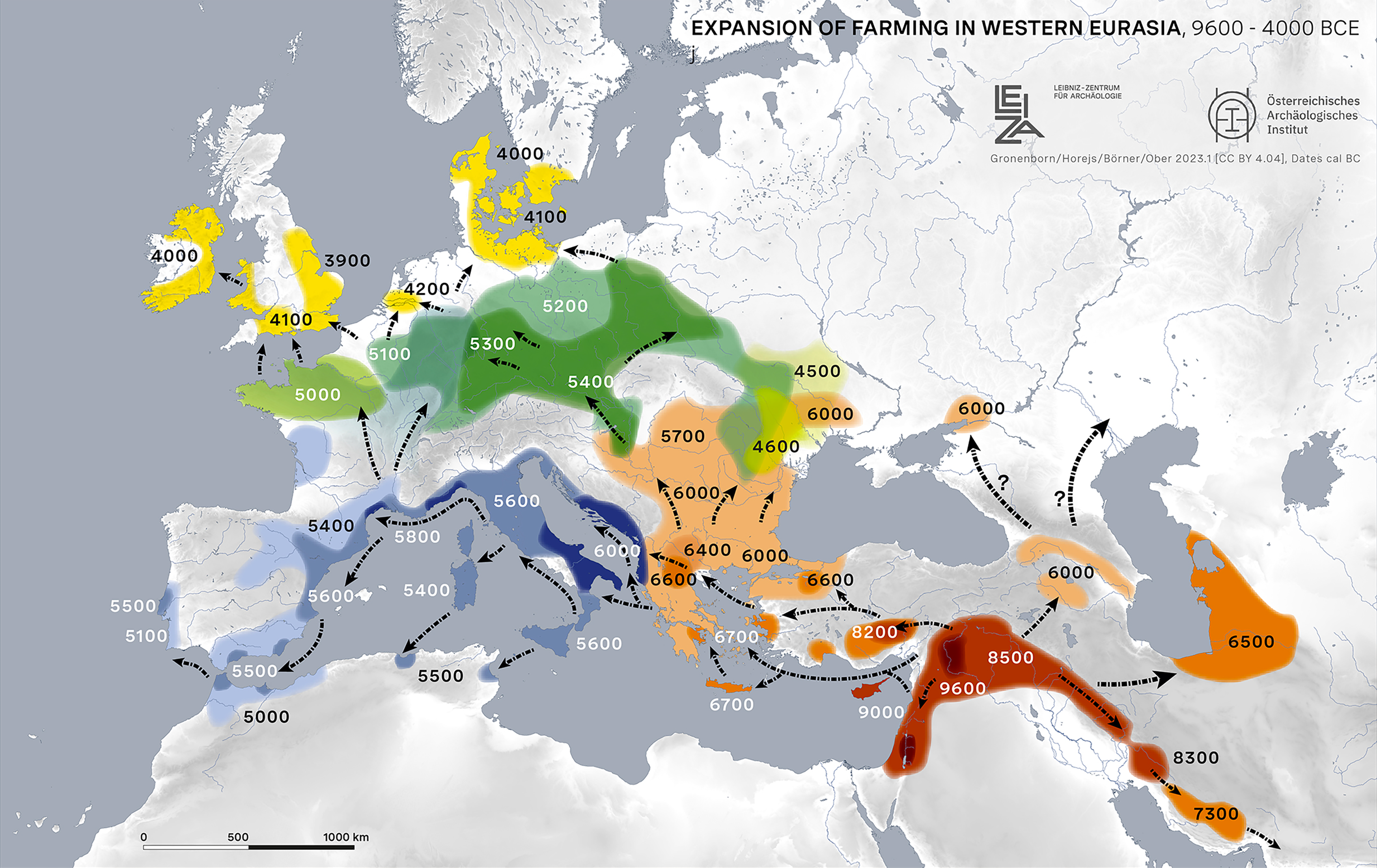
Map of the spread of farming into Europe up to about 3900 BC

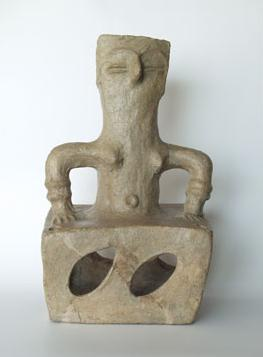
Female figure from Tumba Madžari, North Macedonia

The European Neolithic is the period from the arrival of Neolithic (New Stone Age) technology and the associated population of Early European Farmers in Europe, c. 7000 BC (the approximate time of the first farming societies in Greece) until c. 2000–1700 BC (the beginning of Bronze Age Europe with the Nordic Bronze Age). The Neolithic overlaps the Mesolithic and Bronze Age periods in Europe as cultural changes moved from the southeast to northwest at about 1 km/year – this is called the Neolithic Expansion.

The duration of the Neolithic varies from place to place, its end marked by the introduction of bronze tools: in southeast Europe it is approximately 4,000 years (i.e. 7000 BC–3000 BC) while in parts of Northwest Europe it is just under 3,000 years (c. 4500 BC–1700 BC). In parts of Europe, notably the Balkans, the period after c. 5000 BC is known as the Chalcolithic (Copper Age) due to the invention of copper smelting and the prevalence of copper tools, weapons and other artifacts.

The spread of the Neolithic from the Pre-Pottery Neolithic in the Near East to Europe was first studied quantitatively in the 1970s, when a sufficient number of ^{14}C age determinations for early Neolithic sites had become available. Ammerman and Cavalli-Sforza discovered a linear relationship between the age of an Early Neolithic site and its distance from the conventional source in the Near East (Jericho), thus demonstrating that the Neolithic spread at an average speed of about 1 km/yr. More recent studies confirm these results and yield a speed of 0.6–1.3 km/yr at a 95% confidence level.

== Basic cultural characteristics ==
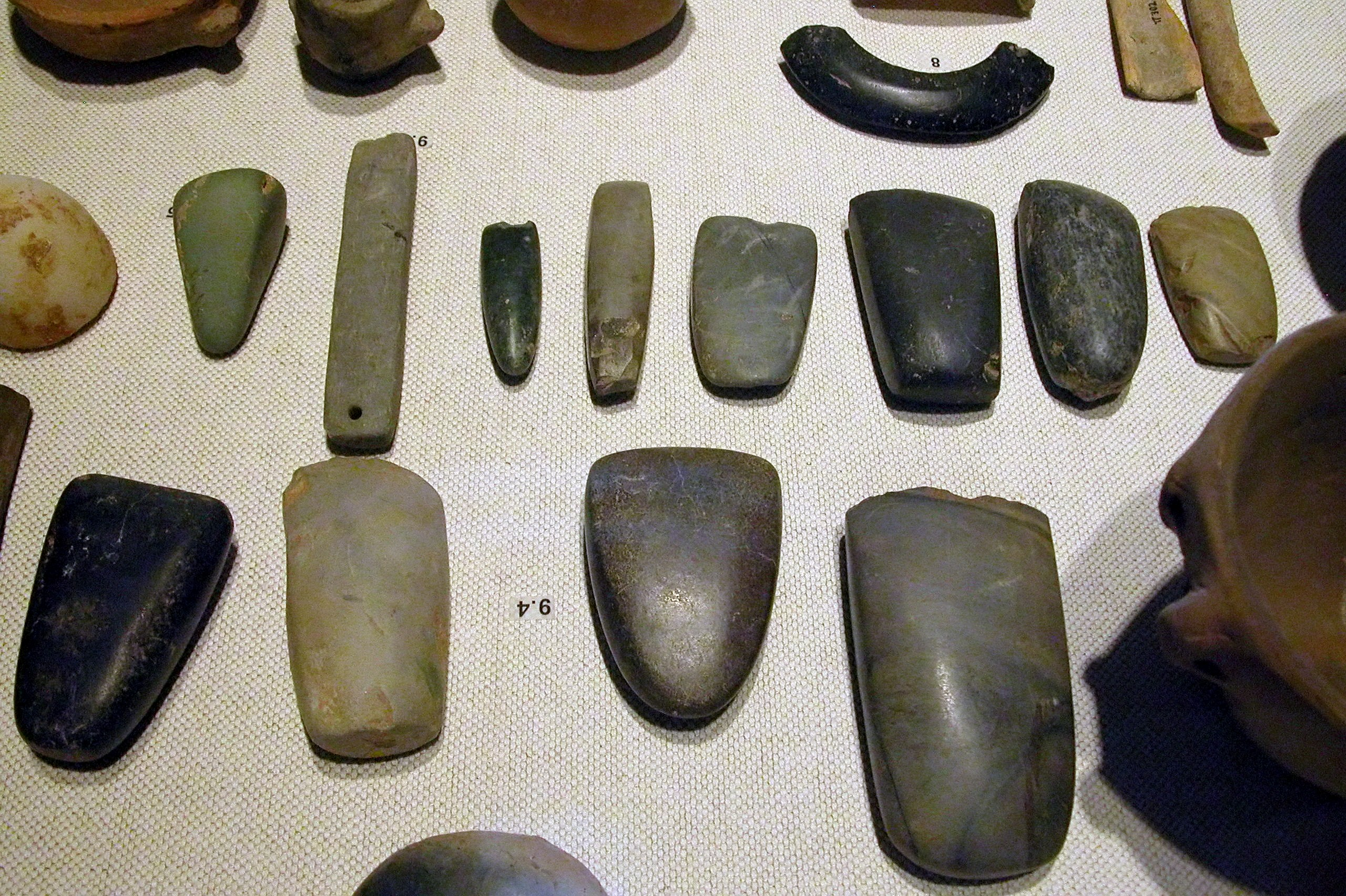
An array of Neolithic artifacts, including bracelets, axe heads, chisels, and polishing tools

Regardless of specific chronology, many European Neolithic groups share basic characteristics, such as living in small-scale, family-based communities, subsisting on domesticated plants and animals supplemented with the collection of wild plant foods and with hunting, and producing hand-made pottery, that is, pottery made without the potter's wheel. Polished stone axes lie at the heart of the neolithic (new stone) culture, enabling forest clearance for agriculture and production of wood for dwellings, as well as fuel.

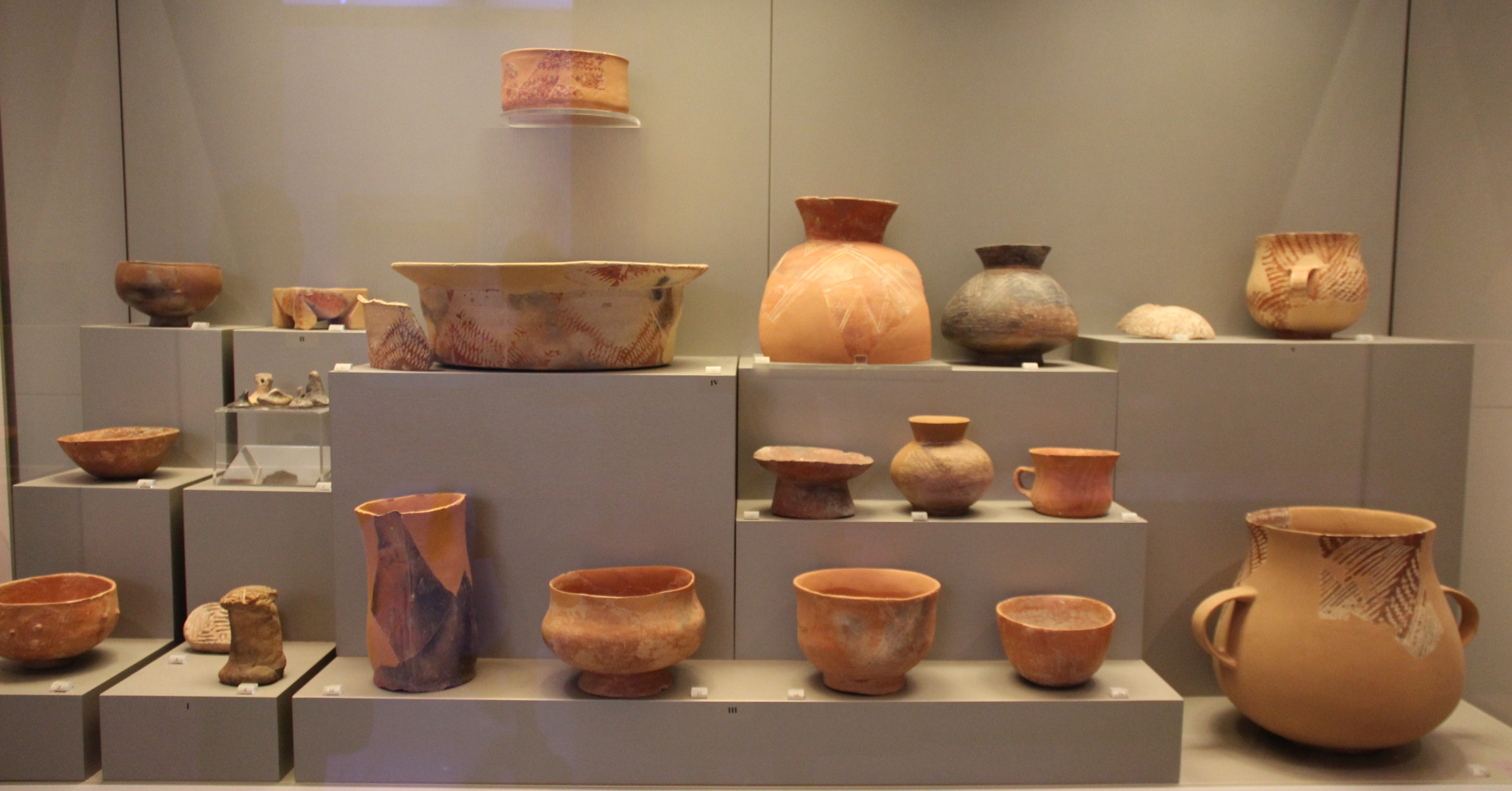
Ancient Greek Early and Middle Neolithic pottery 6500–5300 BC. National Museum of Archaeology, Athens

There are also many differences, with some Neolithic communities in southeastern Europe living in heavily fortified settlements of 3,000–4,000 people (e.g., Sesklo in Greece) whereas Neolithic groups in Britain were small (possibly 50–100 people) and highly mobile cattle-herders.

The details of the origin, chronology, social organization, subsistence practices and ideology of the peoples of Neolithic Europe are obtained from archaeology, and not historical records, since these people left none. Since the 1970s, population genetics has provided independent data on the population history of Neolithic Europe, including migration events and genetic relationships with peoples in South Asia.

A further independent tool, linguistics, has contributed hypothetical reconstructions of early European languages and family trees with estimates of dating of splits, in particular theories on the relationship between speakers of Indo-European languages and Neolithic peoples. Some archaeologists believe that the expansion of Neolithic peoples from southwest Asia into Europe, marking the eclipse of Mesolithic culture, coincided with the introduction of Indo-European speakers, whereas other archaeologists and many linguists believe the Indo-European languages were introduced from the Pontic–Caspian steppe during the succeeding Bronze Age. More recent archaeogenetic evidence has made a later origin in the Pontic-Caspian steppe unrelated to Neolithic farmers appear far more likely.

== Archaeology ==
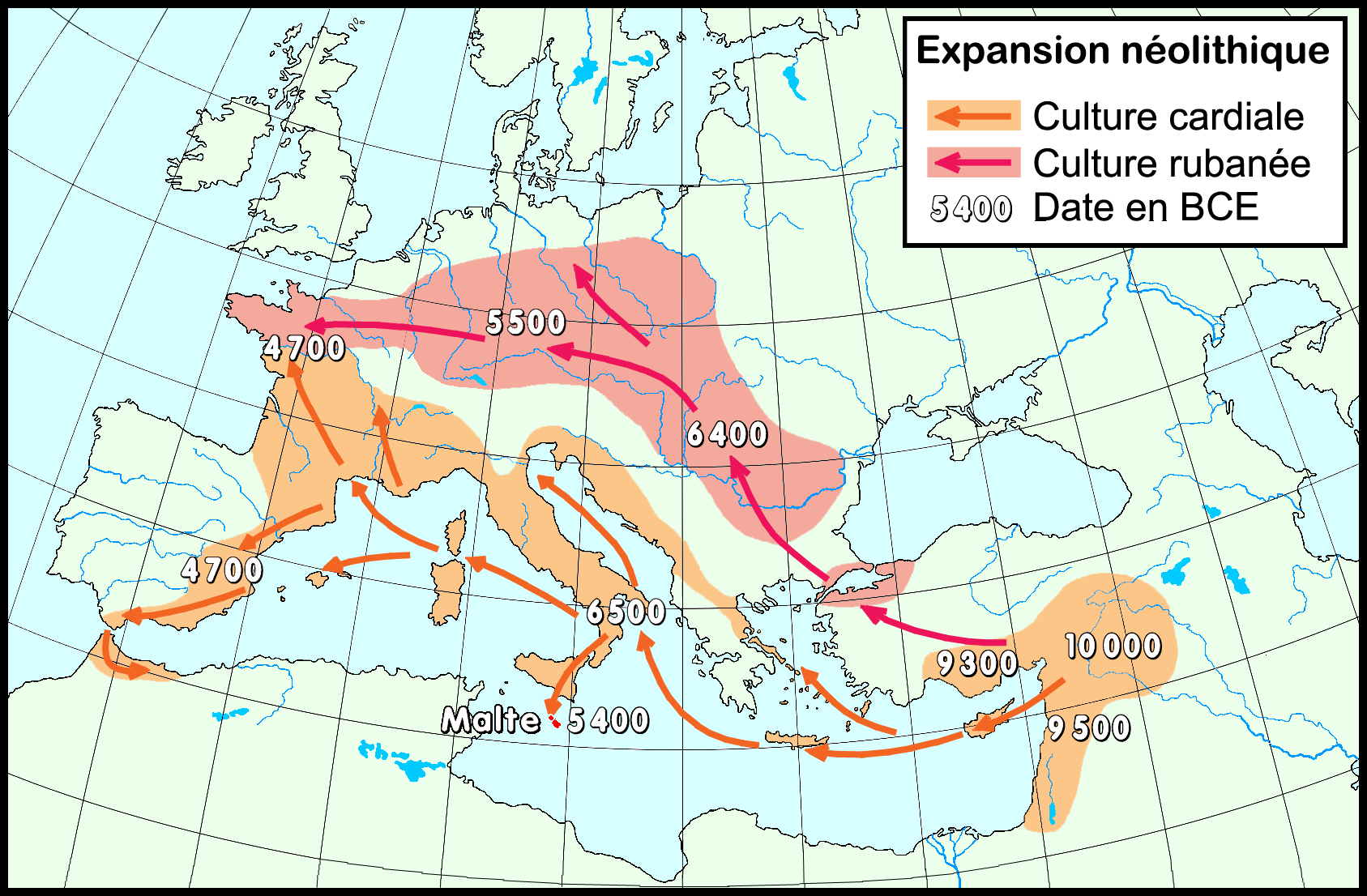
Neolithic expansion of Cardium pottery and Linear Pottery culture according to archaeology

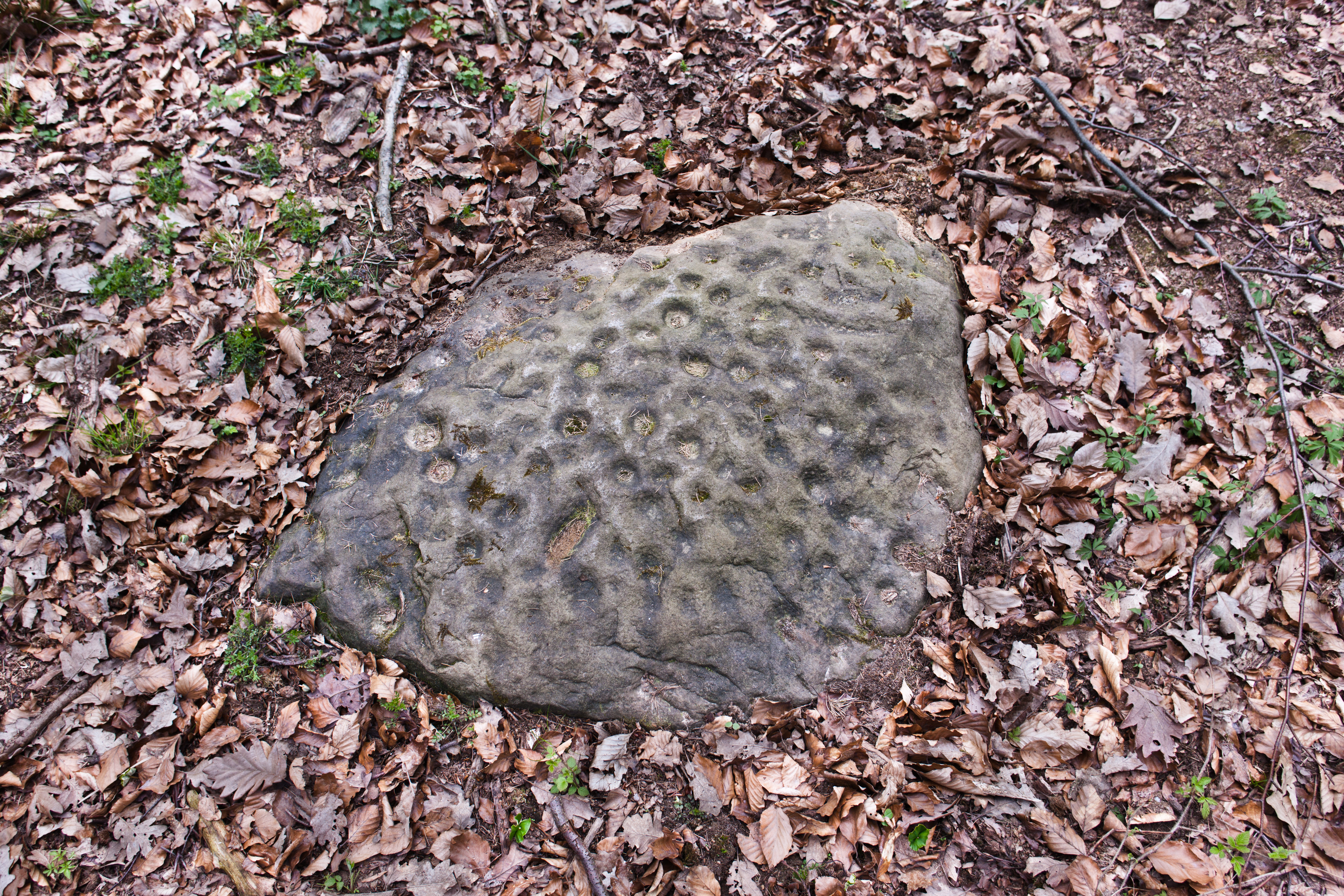
A stone used in Neolithic rituals, in Detmerode, Wolfsburg, Germany

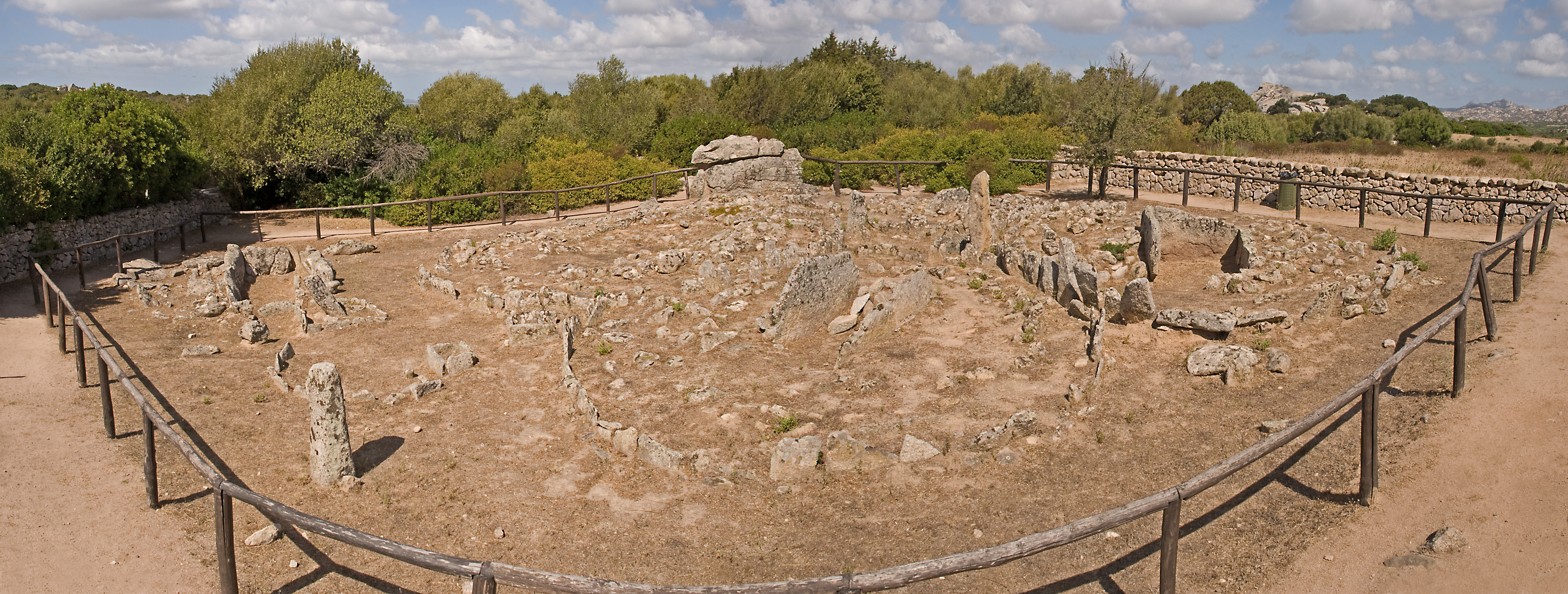
Circular graves of Li Muri at Arzachena, one of the oldest megalithic sites in Italy dating to c. 4000–3300 BC

Archeologists trace the emergence of food-producing societies in the Levantine region of Middle East to the close of the last glacial period around 12,000 BC, and these developed into a number of regionally distinctive cultures by the eighth millennium BC. Remains of food-producing societies in the Aegean have been carbon-dated to c. 6500 BCE at Knossos, Franchthi Cave, and a number of mainland sites in Thessaly. Neolithic groups appear soon afterwards in the rest of Southeast Europe and south-central Europe. The Neolithic cultures of Southeast Europe (including the Aegean) show some continuity with groups in Middle East and Anatolia (e.g., Çatalhöyük).

In 2018, an 8,000-year-old ceramic figurine portraying the head of the "Mother Goddess", was found near Uzunovo, Vidin Province in Bulgaria, which pushes back the Neolithic revolution to 7th millennium BC.

Current evidence suggests that Neolithic material culture was introduced to Europe via western Anatolia, and that similarities in cultures of North Africa and the Pontic steppes are due to diffusion out of Europe. All Neolithic sites in Europe contain ceramics, and contain the plants and animals domesticated in Middle East: einkorn, emmer, barley, lentils, pigs, goats, sheep, and cattle. Genetic data suggest that no independent domestication of animals took place in Neolithic Europe, and that all domesticated animals were originally domesticated in Middle East. The only domesticate not from Middle East was broomcorn millet, domesticated in East Asia. The earliest evidence of cheese-making dates to 5500 BC in Kuyavia, Poland.

Archaeologists agreed for some time that the culture of the early Neolithic is relatively homogeneous, compared to the late Mesolithic. DNA studies tend to confirm this, indicating that agriculture was brought to Western Europe by the Aegean populations, that are known as 'the Aegean Neolithic farmers'. When these farmers arrived in Britain, DNA studies show that they did not seem to mix much with the earlier population of the Western Hunter-Gatherers. Instead, there was a substantial population replacement.

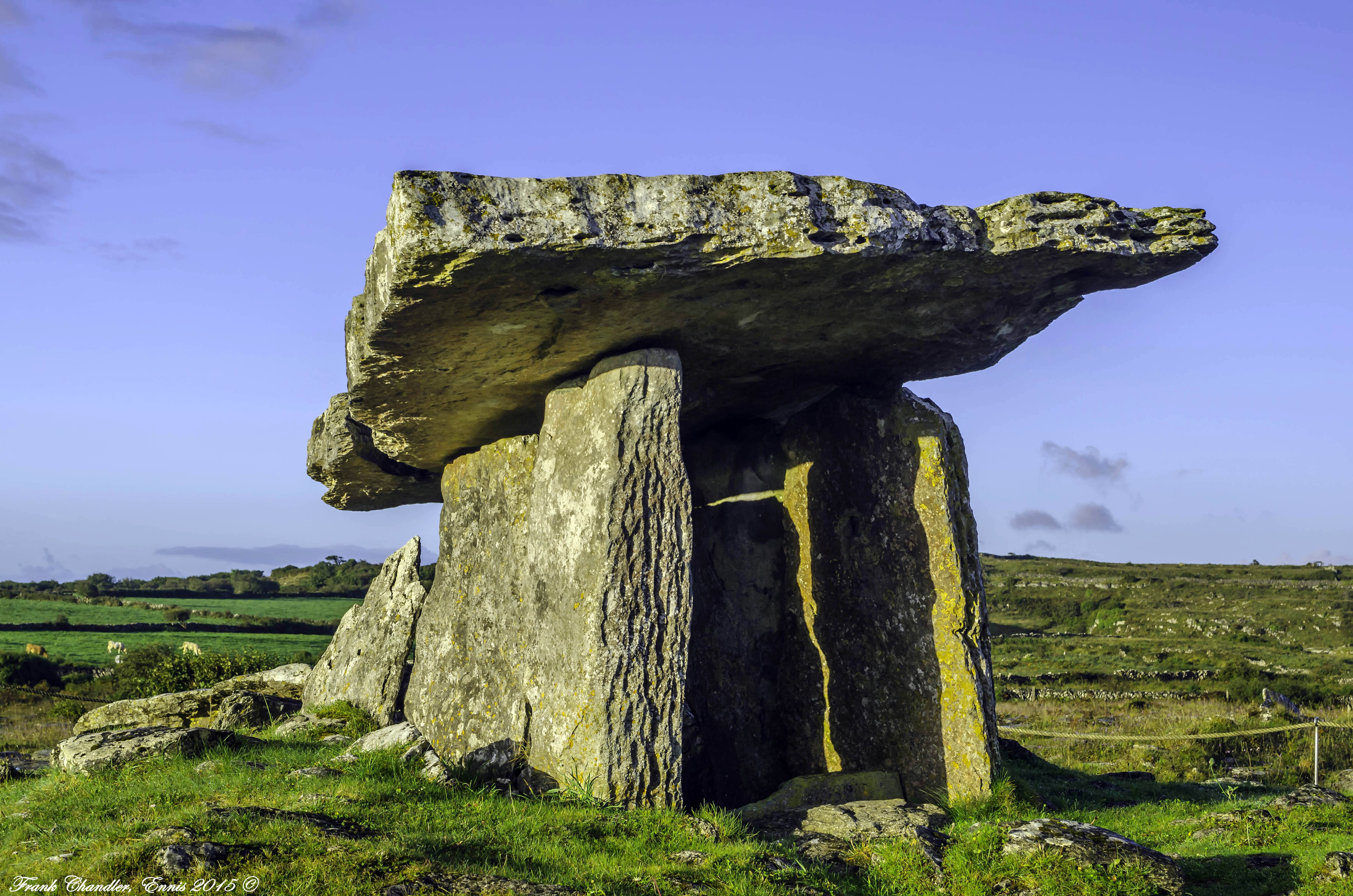
Poulnabrone dolmen, the Burren, County Clare, Ireland

The diffusion of these farmers across Europe, from the Aegean to Britain, took about 2,500 years (6500–4000 BC). The Baltic region was penetrated a bit later, c. 3500 BC, and there was also a delay in settling the Pannonian plain. In general, colonization shows a "saltatory" pattern, as the Neolithic advanced from one patch of fertile alluvial soil to another, bypassing mountainous areas. Analysis of radiocarbon dates show clearly that Mesolithic and Neolithic populations lived side by side for as much as a millennium in many parts of Europe, especially in the Iberian Peninsula and along the Atlantic coast.

Investigation of the Neolithic skeletons found in the Talheim Death Pit suggests that prehistoric men from neighboring tribes were prepared to fight and kill each other in order to capture and secure women. The mass grave at Talheim in southern Germany is one of the earliest known sites in the archaeological record that shows evidence of organised violence in Early Neolithic Europe, among various Linear Pottery culture tribes. The archaeological site of Herxheim contained the scattered remains of more than 1000 individuals from different, in some cases faraway regions, who died around 5000 BC. Whether they were war captives or human sacrifices is unclear, but the evidence indicates that their corpses were spit-roasted whole and then consumed.

In terms of overall size, some settlements of the Cucuteni–Trypillia culture, such as Talianki (with a population of around 15,000) in western Ukraine, were as large as the city-states of Sumer in the Fertile Crescent, and these Eastern European settlements predate the Sumerian cities by more than half of a millennium.

== End of the Neolithic and transition to the Copper age ==
With some exceptions, population levels rose rapidly at the beginning of the Neolithic until they reached the carrying capacity. This was followed by a population crash of "enormous magnitude" after 5000 BC, with levels remaining low during the next 1,500 years.

The oldest golden artifacts in the world (4600 BC – 4200 BC) are found in the Varna Necropolis, Bulgaria – grave offerings on exposition in Varna Archaeological Museum

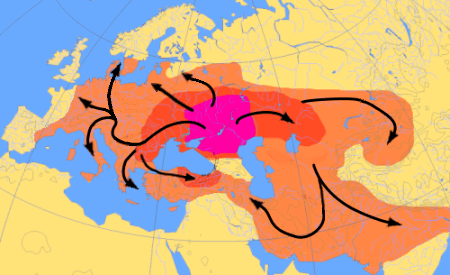
Scheme of Indo-European migrations from c. 4000 to 1000 BC according to the widely held Kurgan hypothesis. These migrations are thought to have spread Yamnaya steppe pastoralist ancestry and Indo-European languages throughout large parts of Eurasia.

Populations began to rise after 3500 BC, with further dips and rises occurring between 3000 and 2500 BC but varying in date between regions. Around this time is the Neolithic decline, when populations collapsed across most of Europe, possibly caused by climatic conditions, plague, or mass migration. A study of twelve European regions found most experienced boom and bust patterns and suggested an "endogenous, not climatic cause". Recent archaeological evidence suggests the possibility of plague causing this population collapse, as mass graves dating from c. 2900 BC were discovered containing fragments of Yersinia pestis genetic material consistent with pneumonic plague.

The Chalcolithic Age in Europe started from about 3500 BC, followed soon after by the European Bronze Age. This also became a period of increased megalithic construction. From 3500 BC, copper was being used in the Balkans and eastern and central Europe. Also, the domestication of the horse took place during that time, resulting in the increased mobility of cultures.

Nearing the close of the Neolithic, c. 2500 BC, large numbers of Eurasian steppe peoples migrated in Southeast and Central from eastern Europe, from the Pontic–Caspian steppe north of the Black Sea.

== Gallery ==
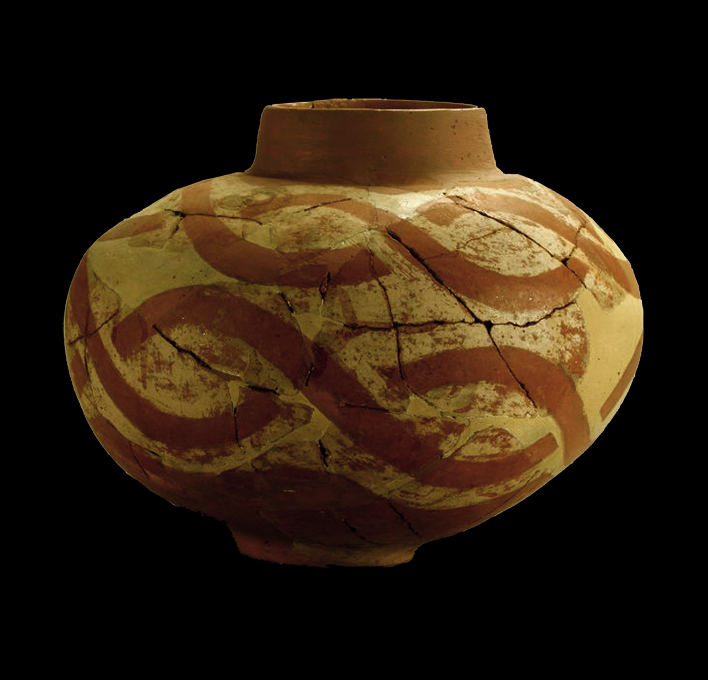
Pottery, 6th millennium BC (Karanovo I, Bulgaria)

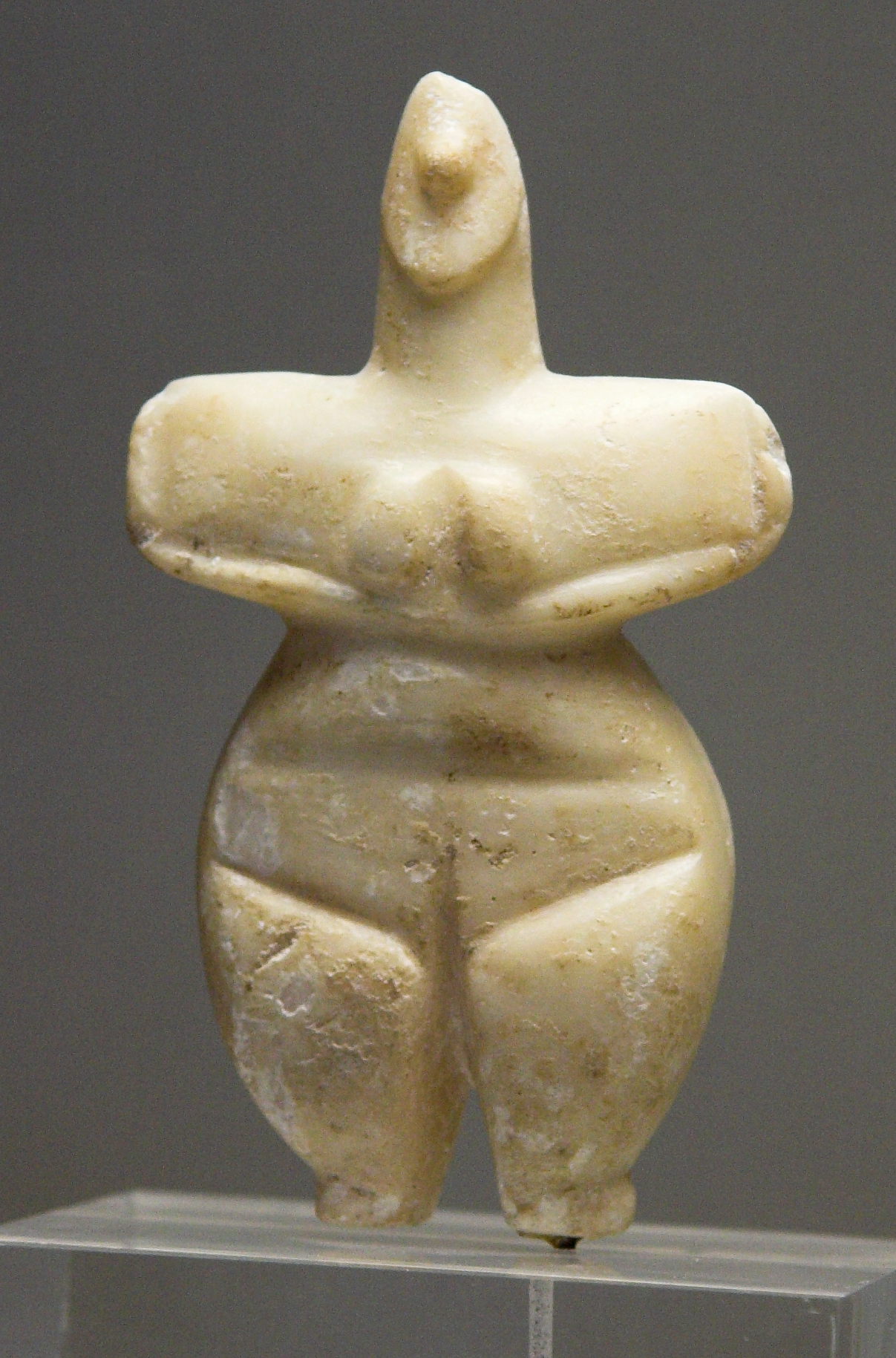
Female figurine, marble, Thessaly, 5300–3300 BC. Neolithic Greece.

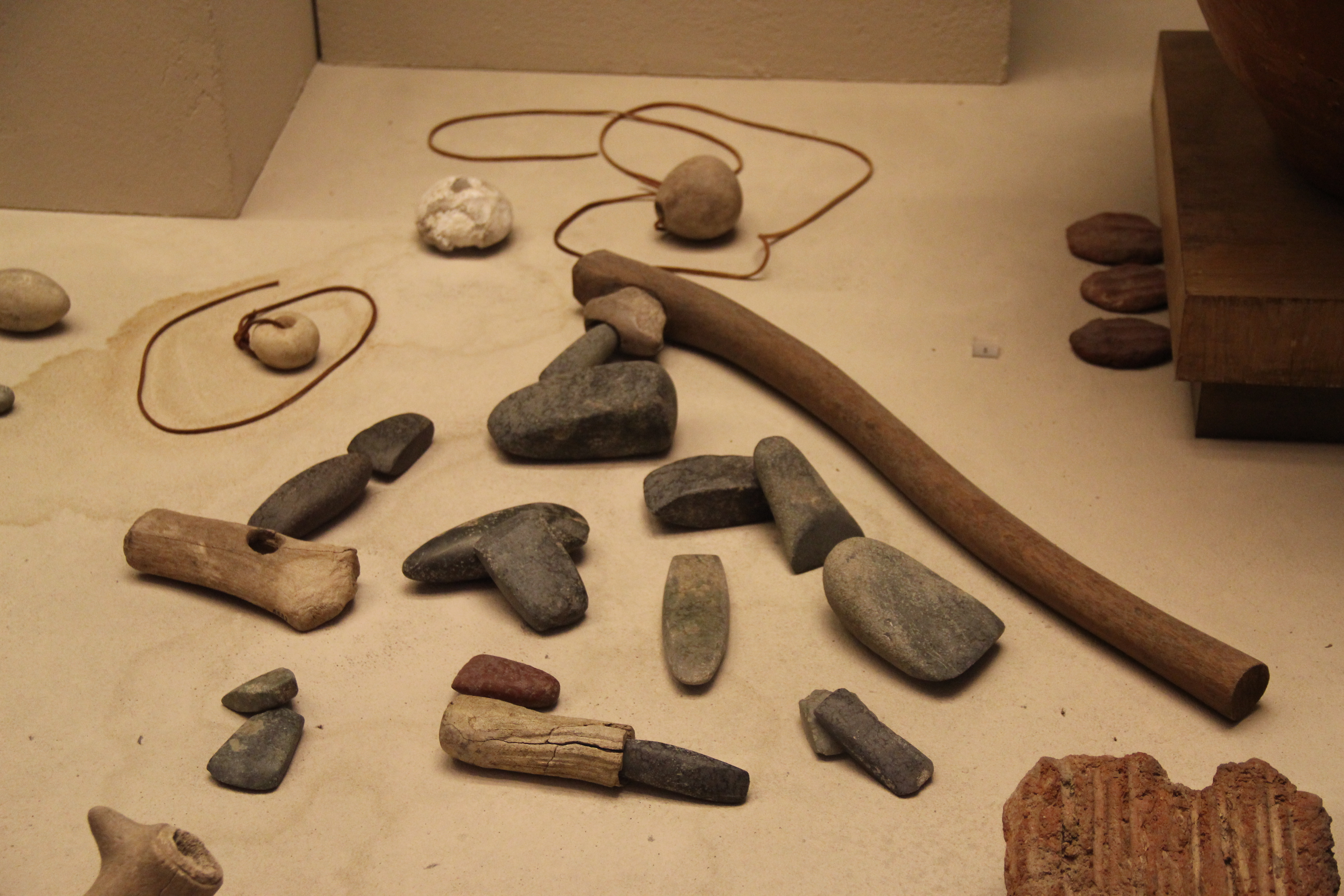
Ancient Neolithic Greece stone tools and weapons

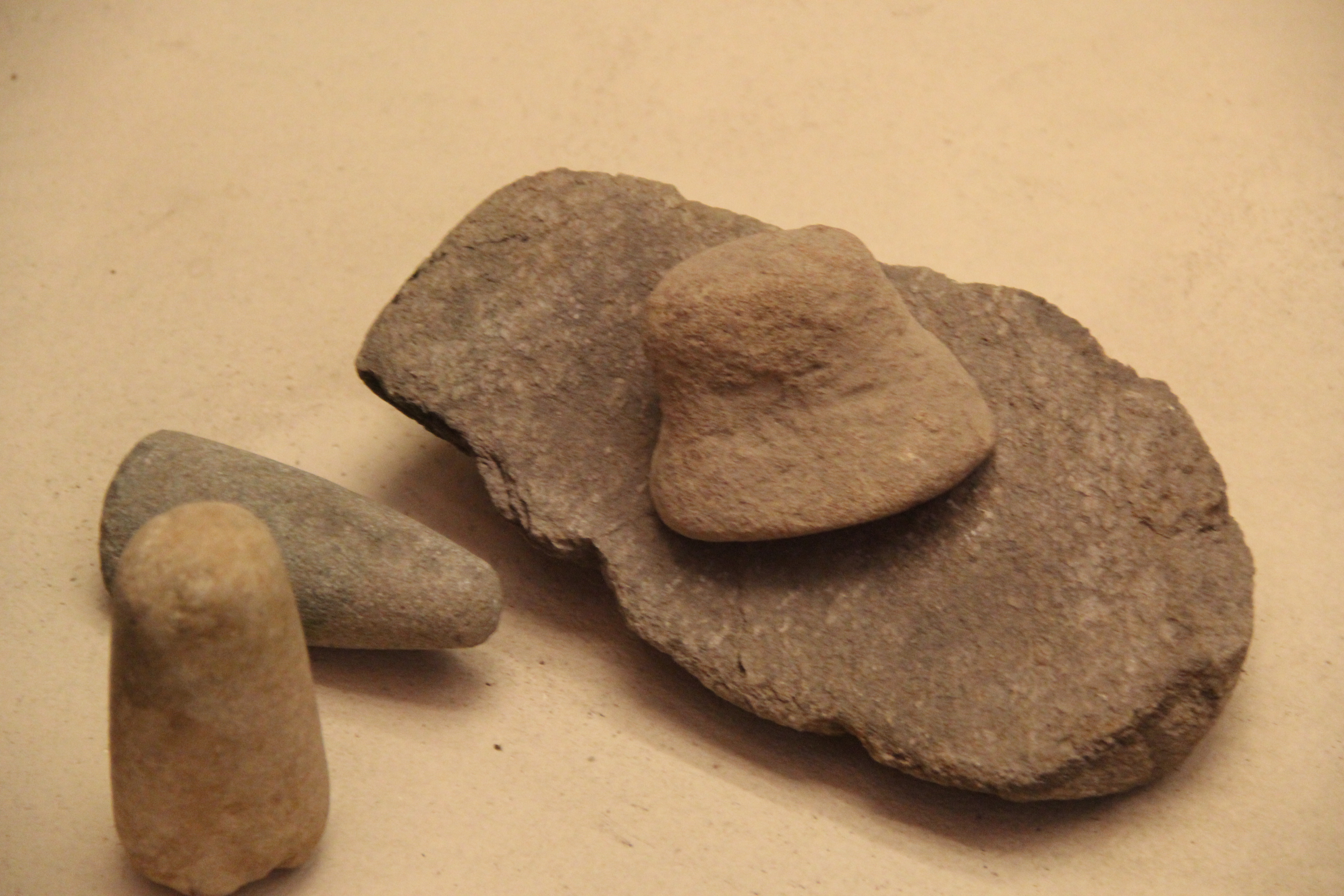
Ancient Neolithic Greece stone grinder.

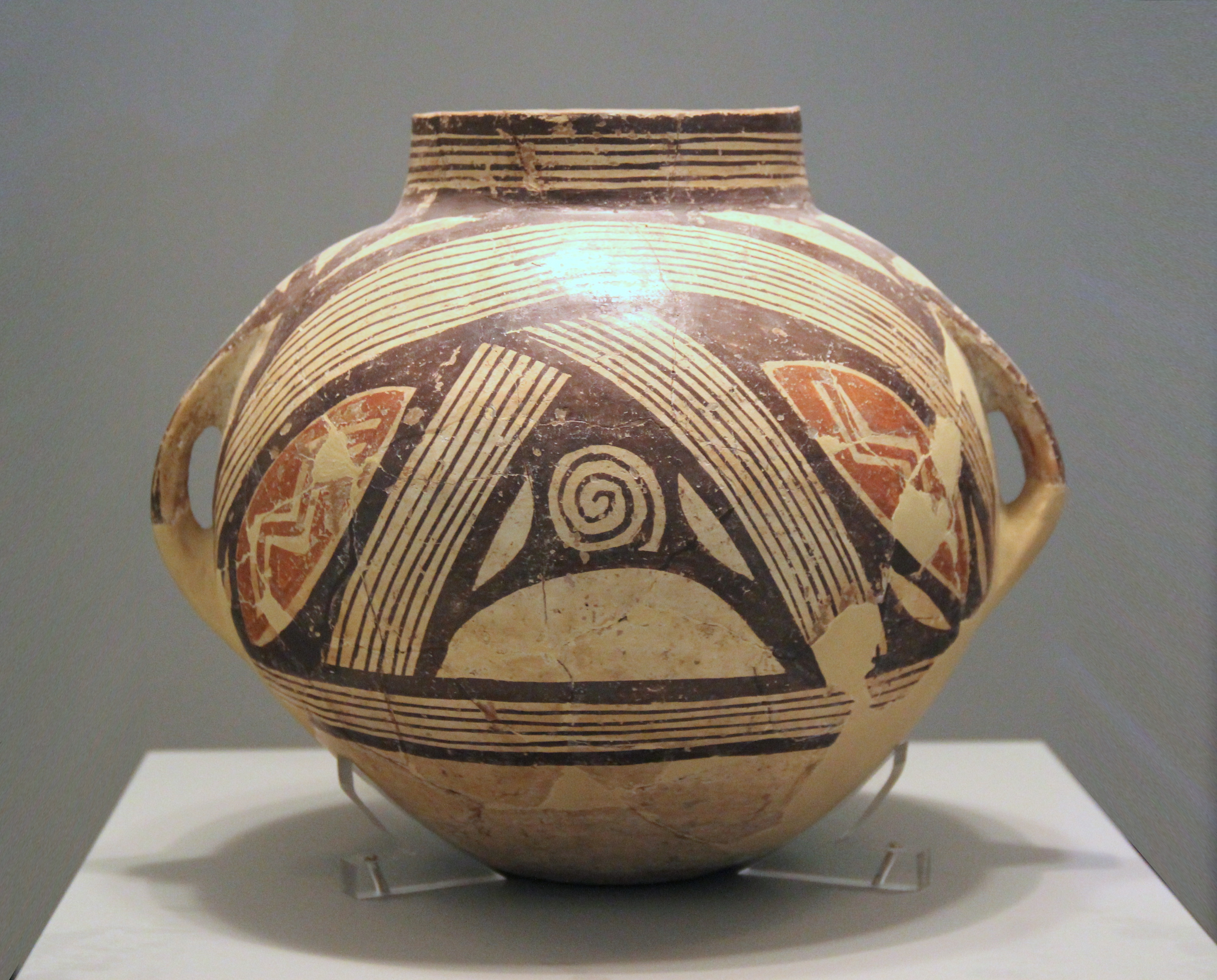
Clay vase with polychrome decoration, Dimini, Neolithic Greece (5300–3300 BC)

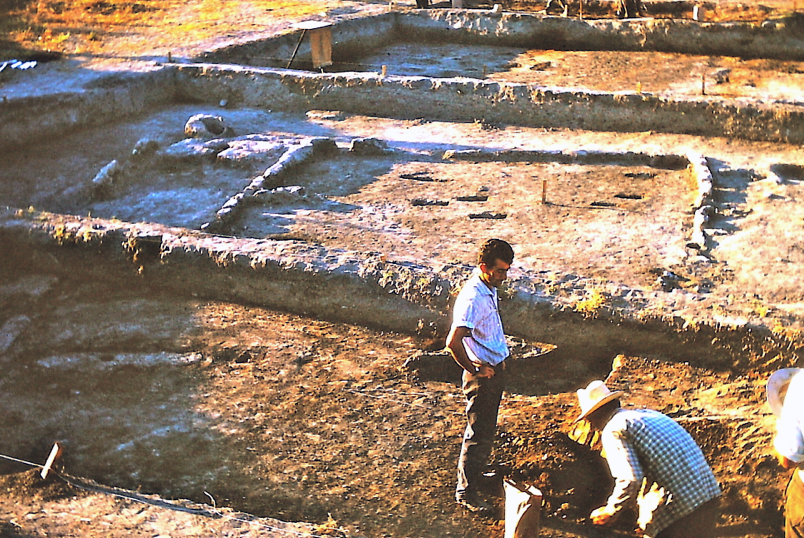
Neolithic site of Nea Nikomedeia, Northern Greece

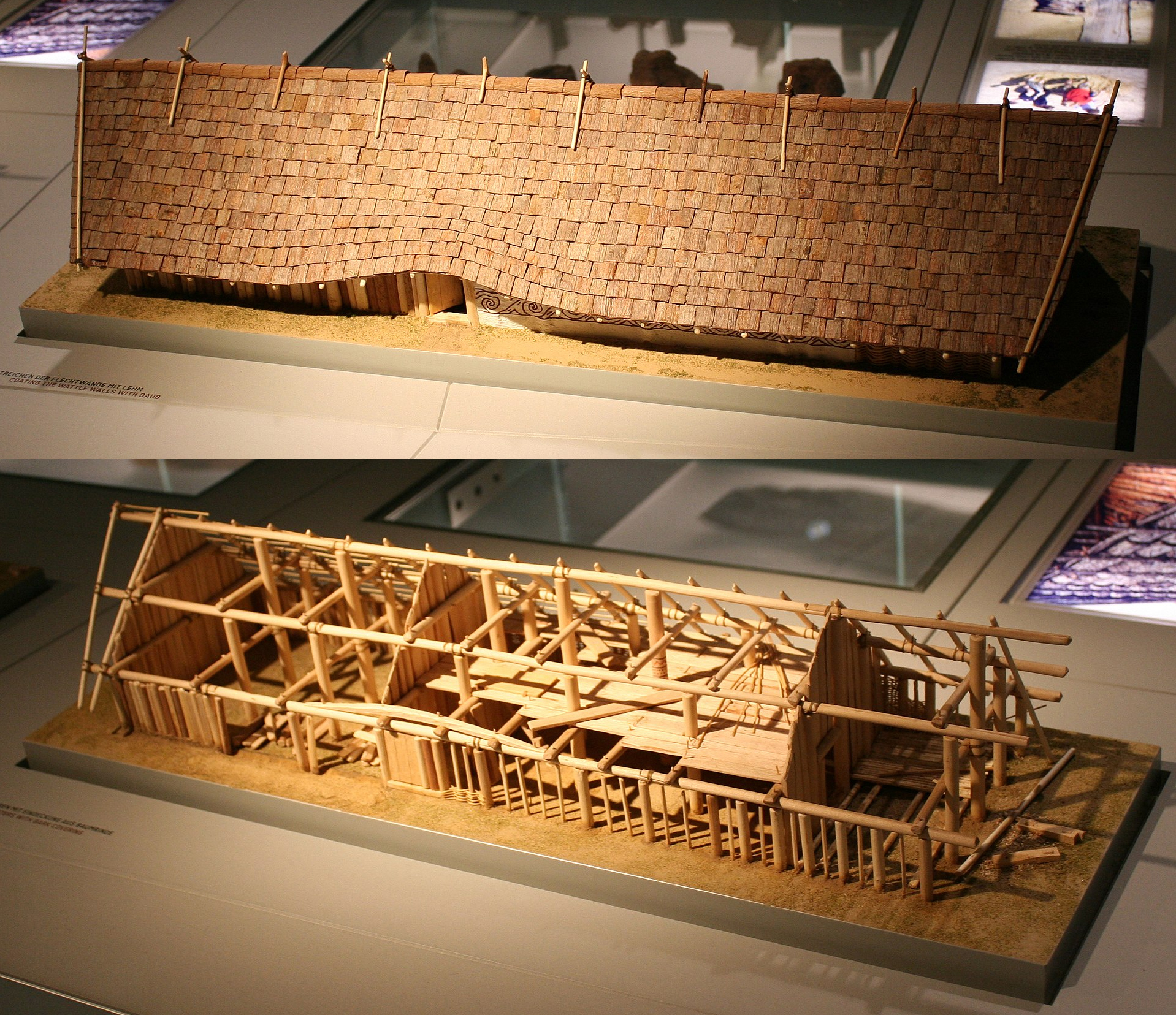
Neolithic long house, Germany, 5000 BC

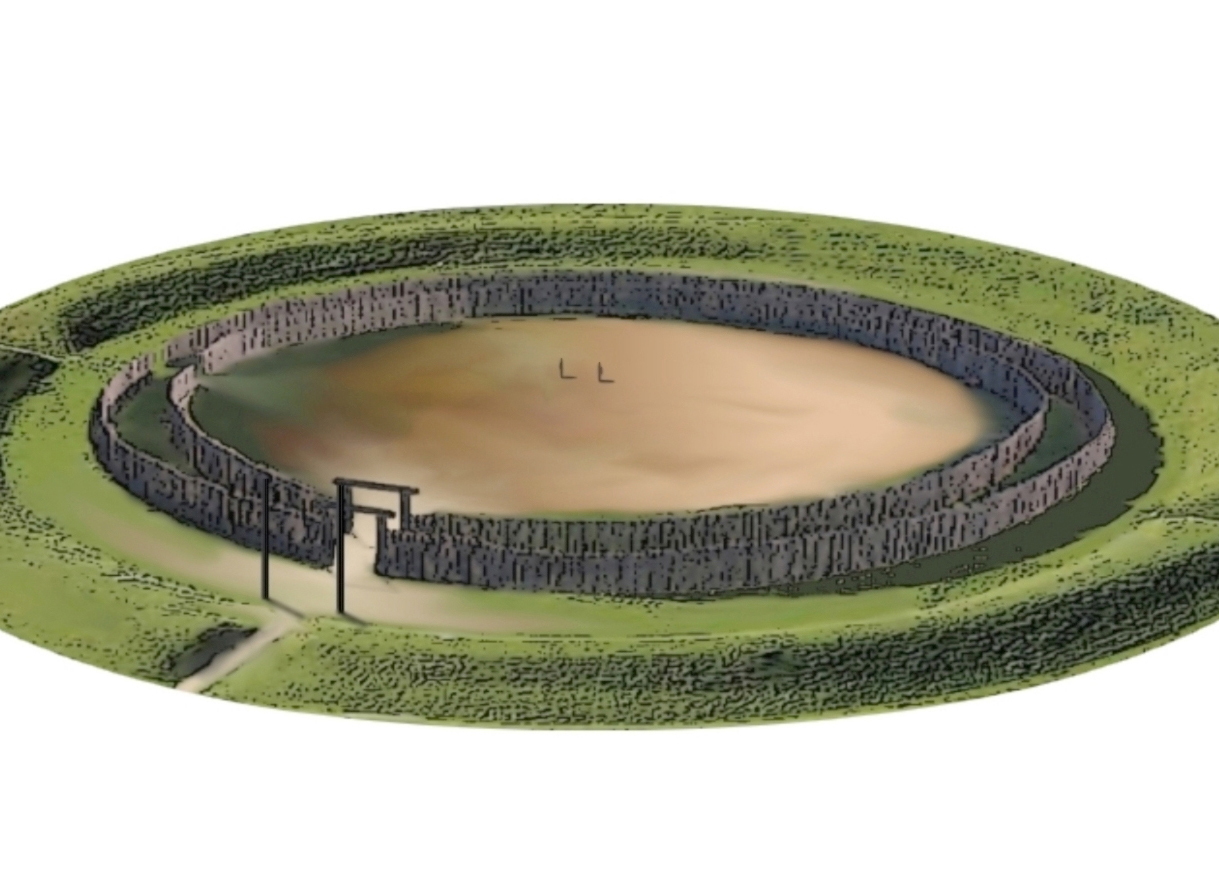
Goseck Circle, Germany, 4900 BC

== Genetics ==
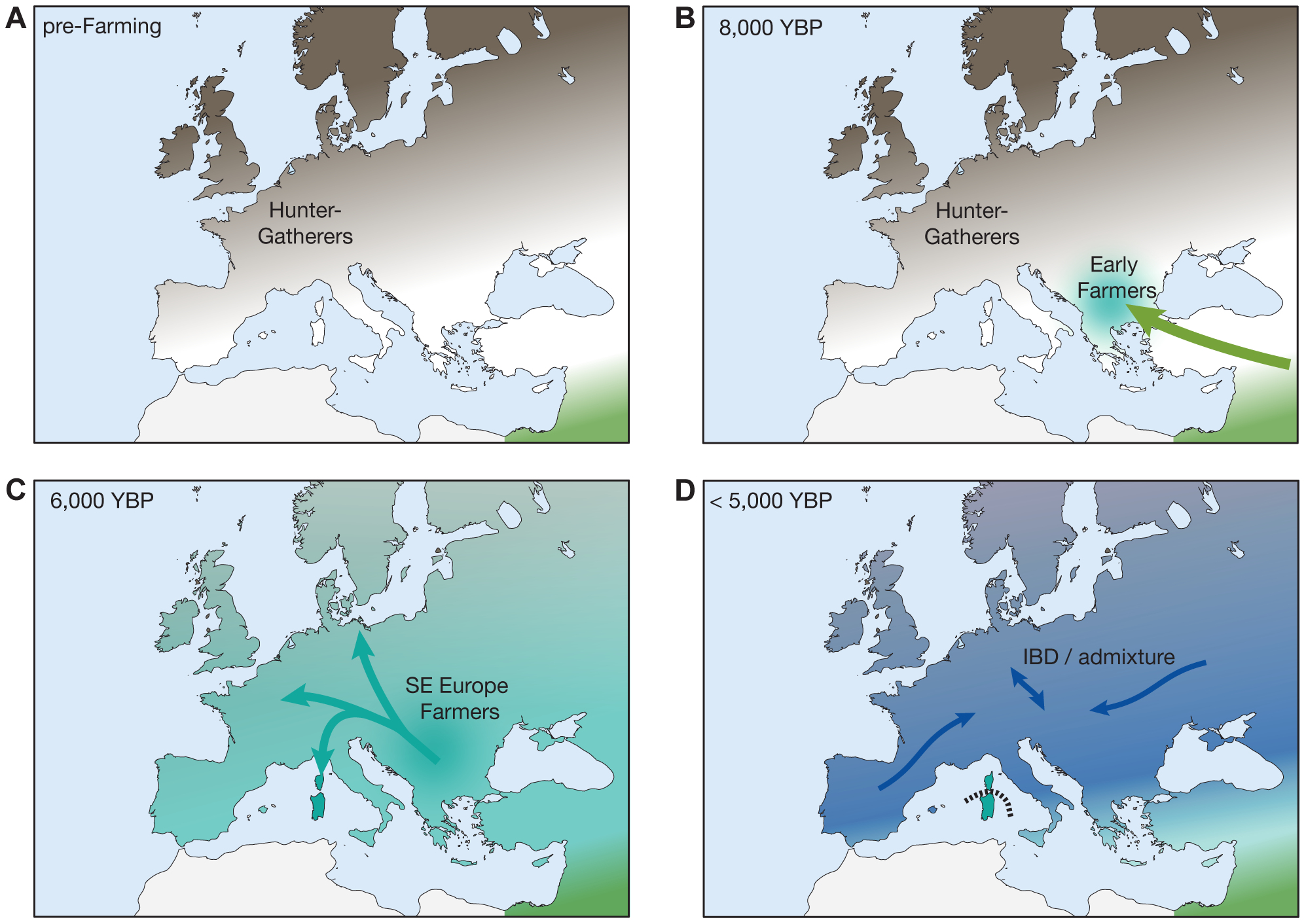
Simplified model for the demographic history of Europeans during the Neolithic period in the Neolithic Revolution's introduction of agriculture

Genetic studies since the 2010s have identified the genetic contribution of Neolithic farmers to modern European populations, providing quantitative results relevant to the long-standing "replacement model" vs. "demic diffusion" dispute in archaeology.

The earlier population of Europe were the Mesolithic hunter-gatherers, called the "Western Hunter-Gatherers" (WHG). Along with the Scandinavian Hunter-Gatherers (SHG) and Eastern Hunter-Gatherers (EHG), the WHGs constituted one of the three main genetic groups in the postglacial period of early Holocene Europe. Later, the Neolithic farmers expanded from the Aegean and Near East; in various studies, they are described as the Early European Farmers (EEF); Aegean Neolithic Farmers (ANF), First European Farmers (FEF), or also as the Early Neolithic Farmers (ENF).

A seminal 2014 study first identified the contribution of three main components to modern European lineages (the third being "Ancient North Eurasians", associated with the later Indo-European expansion). The EEF component was identified based on the genome of a woman buried c. 7,000 years ago in a Linear Pottery culture grave in Stuttgart, Germany.

This 2014 study found evidence for genetic mixing between WHG and EEF throughout Europe, with the largest contribution of EEF in Mediterranean Europe (especially in Sardinia, Sicily, Malta and among Ashkenazi Jews), and the largest contribution of WHG in Northern Europe and among Basque people.

Nevertheless, DNA studies show that when the Neolithic farmers arrived in Britain, these two groups did not seem to mix much. Instead, there was a substantial population replacement.

Since 2014, further studies have refined the picture of interbreeding between EEF and WHG. In a 2017 analysis of 180 ancient DNA datasets of the Chalcolithic and Neolithic periods from Hungary, Germany and Spain, evidence was found of a prolonged period of interbreeding. Admixture took place regionally, from local hunter-gatherer populations, so that populations from the three regions (Germany, Iberia and Hungary) were genetically distinguishable at all stages of the Neolithic period, with a gradually increasing ratio of WHG ancestry of farming populations over time. This suggests that after the initial expansion of early farmers, there were no further long-range migrations substantial enough to homogenize the farming population, and that farming and hunter-gatherer populations existed side by side for many centuries, with ongoing gradual admixture throughout the 5th to 4th millennia BC (rather than a single admixture event on initial contact). Admixture rates varied geographically; in the late Neolithic, WHG ancestry in farmers in Hungary was at around 10%, in Germany around 25% and in Iberia as high as 50%.

During late Neolithic and early Bronze Age, the EEF-derived cultures of Europe were overwhelmed by successive invasions of Western Steppe Herders (WSHs) from the Pontic–Caspian steppe. These invasions led to EEF paternal DNA lineages in Europe being almost entirely replaced with WSH paternal DNA (mainly R1b and R1a). EEF mtDNA however remained frequent, suggesting admixture between WSH males and EEF females.

=== History of research [pre-2010] ===
Perhaps the first scholar to posit a large-scale Neolithic migration, based on genetic evidence, was Luigi Luca Cavalli-Sforza. By applying principal component analysis to data from "classical genetic markers" (protein polymorphisms from ABO blood groups, HLA loci, immunoglobulins, etc.), Cavalli-Sforza discovered interesting clues about the genetic makeup of Europeans. Although being very genetically homogeneous, several patterns did exist. The most important one was a north-western to south-eastern cline with a Near Eastern focus. Accounting for 28% of the overall genetic diversity in the European samples in his study, he attributed the cline to the spread of agriculture from the Middle East c. 10,000 to 6,000 years ago.

Cavalli-Sforza's explanation of demic diffusions stipulated that the clines were due to the population expansion of neolithic farmers into a scarcely populated, hunter-gathering Europe, with little initial admixture between agriculturalists and foragers. The predicted route for this spread would have been from Anatolia to central Europe via the Balkans. However, given that the time depths of such patterns are not known, "associating them with particular demographic events is usually speculative". Apart from a demic Neolithic migration, the clines may also be compatible with other demographic scenarios (Barbujani and Bartorelle 2001), such as the initial Palaeolithic expansion, the Mesolithic (post-glacial) re-expansions or later (historic) colonizations.

Studies using direct DNA evidence have produced varying results. A notable proponent of Cavalli-Sforza's demic diffusion scenario is Chikhi. In his 1998 study, utilising polymorphic loci from seven hypervariable autosomal DNA loci, an autocorrelation analysis produced a clinal pattern closely matching that in Cavalli-Sforza's study. He calculated that the separation times were no older than 10,000 years. "The simplest interpretation of these results is that the current nuclear gene pool largely reflects the westward and northward expansion of a Neolithic group".

Although the above studies propounded a 'significant' Neolithic genetic contribution, they did not quantify the exact magnitude of the genetic contribution. Dupanloup performed an admixture analysis based on several autosomal loci, mtDNA and NRY haplogroup frequencies. The study was based on the assumption that Basques were modern representatives of Palaeolithic hunter-gatherers' gene pool, and Near Eastern peoples were a proxy population for Neolithic farmers. Subsequently, they used admixture analysis to estimate the likely components of the contemporary European gene pool contributed by the two parental populations whose members hybridized at a certain moment in the past. The study suggested that the greatest Near Eastern admixture occurs in the Balkans (~80%) and Southern Italy (~60%), whilst it is least in peoples of the British Isles (estimating only a 20% contribution). The authors concluded that the Neolithic shift to agriculture entailed major population dispersal from the Near East.

Results derived from analysis of the non-recombining portion of the Y- chromosomes (NRY) produced, at least initially, similar gradients to the classic demic diffusion hypothesis. Two significant studies were Semino 2000 and Rosser 2000, which identified haplogroups J2 and E1b1b (formerly E3b) as the putative genetic signatures of migrating Neolithic farmers from Anatolia, and therefore represent the Y-chromosomal components of a Neolithic demic diffusion.

This association was strengthened when King and Underhill (2002) found that there was a significant correlation between the distribution of Hg J2 and Neolithic painted pottery in European and Mediterranean sites. However, studies of the ancient Y-DNA from the earlier Neolithic cave burials of Cardium pottery culture shows they were mainly haplogroup G2a. These 'Neolithic lineages' accounted for 22% of the total European Y chromosome gene pool, and were predominantly found in Mediterranean regions of Europe (Greece, Italy, southeastern Bulgaria, southeastern Iberia). -->

== Language ==
Neolithic cultures in Europe in c. 4000–3500 BC

There is no direct evidence of the languages spoken in the Neolithic. Some proponents of paleolinguistics attempt to extend the methods of historical linguistics to the Stone Age, but this has little academic support. Criticising scenarios which envision for the Neolithic only a small number of language families spread over huge areas of Europe (as in modern times), Donald Ringe has argued on general principles of language geography (as concerns "tribal", pre-state societies), and the scant remains of (apparently) native, non-Indo-European languages attested in ancient inscriptions, that Neolithic Europe must have been a place of great linguistic diversity, with many language families with no recoverable linguistic links to each other, much like western North America prior to European colonisation.

Discussion of hypothetical languages spoken in the European Neolithic is divided into two topics, Indo-European languages and "Pre-Indo-European" languages.

Early Indo-European languages are usually assumed to have reached Danubian (and maybe Central) Europe in the Chalcolithic or early Bronze Age, e.g. with the Corded Ware or Beaker cultures (see also Kurgan hypothesis for related discussions). The Anatolian hypothesis postulates arrival of Indo-European languages with the early Neolithic. Old European hydronymy is taken by Hans Krahe to be the oldest reflection of the early presence of Indo-European in Europe.

Theories of "Pre-Indo-European" languages in Europe are built on scant evidence. The Basque language is the best candidate for a descendant of such a language, but since Basque is a language isolate, there is no comparative evidence to build upon. Theo Vennemann nevertheless postulates a "Vasconic" family, which he supposes had co-existed with an "Atlantic" or "Semitidic" (i. e., para-Semitic) group. Another candidate is a Tyrrhenian family which would have given rise to Etruscan and Raetic in the Iron Age, and possibly also Aegean languages such as Minoan or Pelasgian in the Bronze Age.

In the north, a similar scenario to Indo-European is thought to have occurred with Uralic languages expanding in from the east. In particular, while the Sami languages of the Sami people from parts of Northern Europe and Russia belong in the Uralic family, they show considerable substrate influence, thought to represent one or more extinct languages spoken before the arrival of the Uralic speakers. The Sami are estimated to have adopted a Uralic language less than 2,500 years ago. Some traces of pre-Uralic and pre-Indo-European languages of the Baltic area have been suspected in the Finnic languages as well, but these are much more modest. There are early loanwords from unidentified non-IE languages in other Uralic languages of Europe as well.

Guus Kroonen brought up the so-called "Agricultural Substrate Hypothesis", based on the comparison of presumable Pre-Germanic and Pre-Greek substrate lexicon (especially agricultural terms without clear IE etymologies). Kroonen links that substrate to the gradual spread of agriculture in Neolithic Europe from Anatolia and the Balkans, and associates the Pre-Germanic agricultural substrate language with the Linear Pottery culture. The prefix *a- and the suffix *-it- are the most apparent linguistic markers by which a small group of "Agricultural" substrate words – i.e. *arwīt ("pea") or *gait ("goat") – can be isolated from the rest of the Proto-Germanic lexicon. According to Aljoša Šorgo, there are at least 36 Proto-Germanic lexical items very likely originating from the "agricultural" substrate language (or a group of closely related languages). It is proposed by Šorgo that the Agricultural substrate was characterized by a four-vowel system of */æ/ */ɑ/ */i/ */u/, the presence of pre-nasalized stops, the absence of a semi-vowel */j/, a mobile stress accent, and reduction of unstressed vowels.

== List of cultures and sites ==
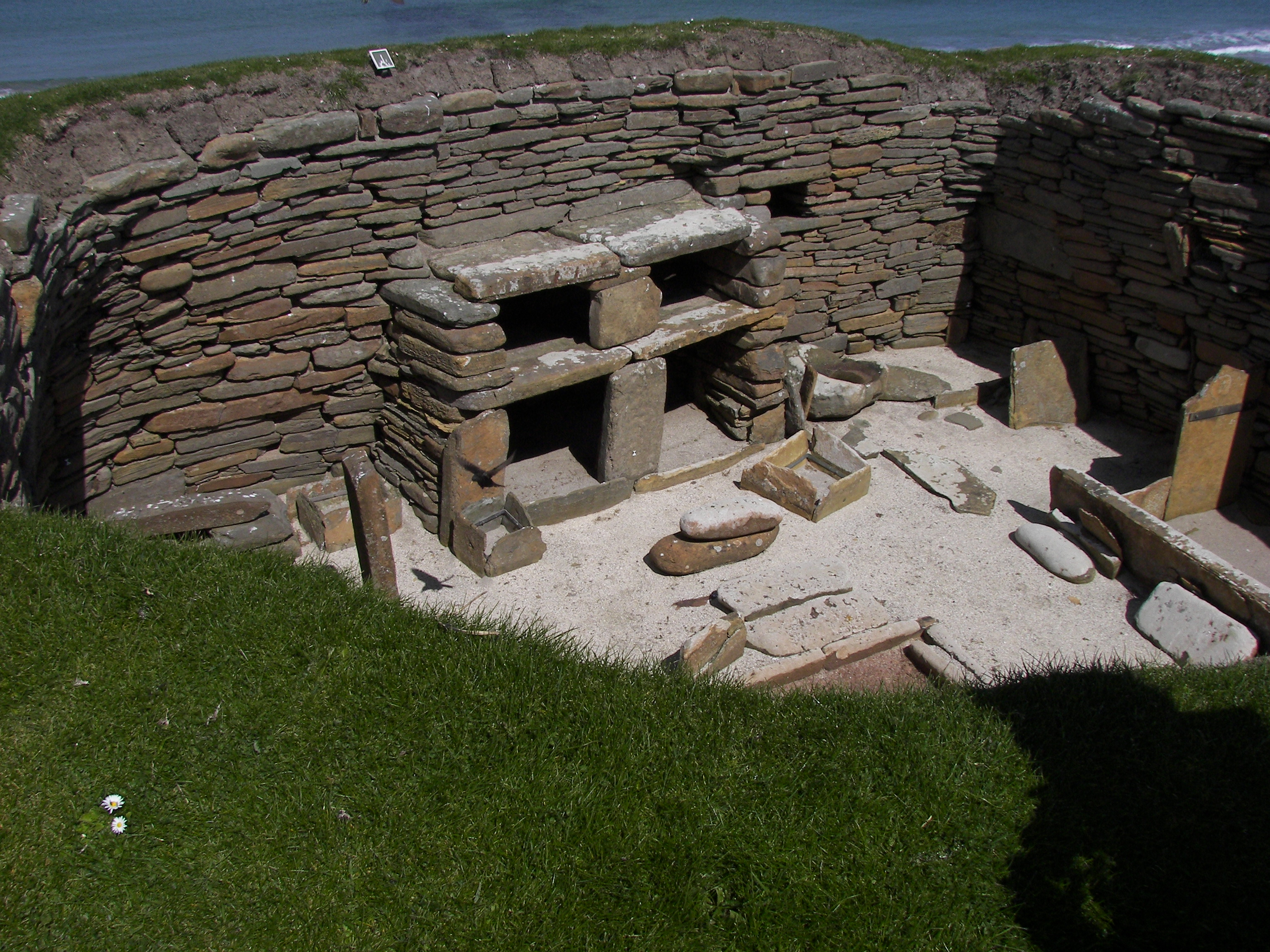
Excavated dwellings at Skara Brae (Orkney, Scotland), Europe's most complete Neolithic village

- Mesolithic/Para-Neolithic
  - Franchthi Cave (Greece, 20th to 3rd millennium BC) First European Neolithic site.
  - Lepenski Vir culture (Serbia, 10th/8th to 6th millennium BC)
  - Megalithic culture (8th to 2nd millennium BC)
  - Elshanka culture (Russia, 7th millennium BC) Oldest European pottery.
  - Bug-Dniester culture (Moldova, Ukraine, 7th to 6th millennium BC)
  - Ertebølle culture (Denmark, 6th to 4th millennium BC)
  - Swifterbant culture (Netherlands, 6th to 4th millennium BC)
  - Neman culture (Poland, Lithuania, 6th to 3rd millennium BC)
  - Dnieper-Donets culture (Ukraine, 5th millennium BC)
- Early Neolithic
  - Khirokitia (Cyprus, 7th to 4th millennium BC)
  - Sesklo culture (Greece, 7th to 5th millennium BC)
  - Cardium pottery culture (Mediterranean coast, 7th to 6th millennium BC)
  - Kakanj culture (Bosnia and Herzegovina, 7th to 5th millennium BC)
  - Starčevo-Criș culture (Starčevo I, Körös, Criş, Central Balkans, 7th to 5th millennium BC)
  - Karanovo culture (Bulgaria, 7th to 5th millennium BC)
  - Dudești culture (Romania, 6th millennium BC)
  - Katundas Cavern (Albania, 6th millennium BC)
- Middle Neolithic
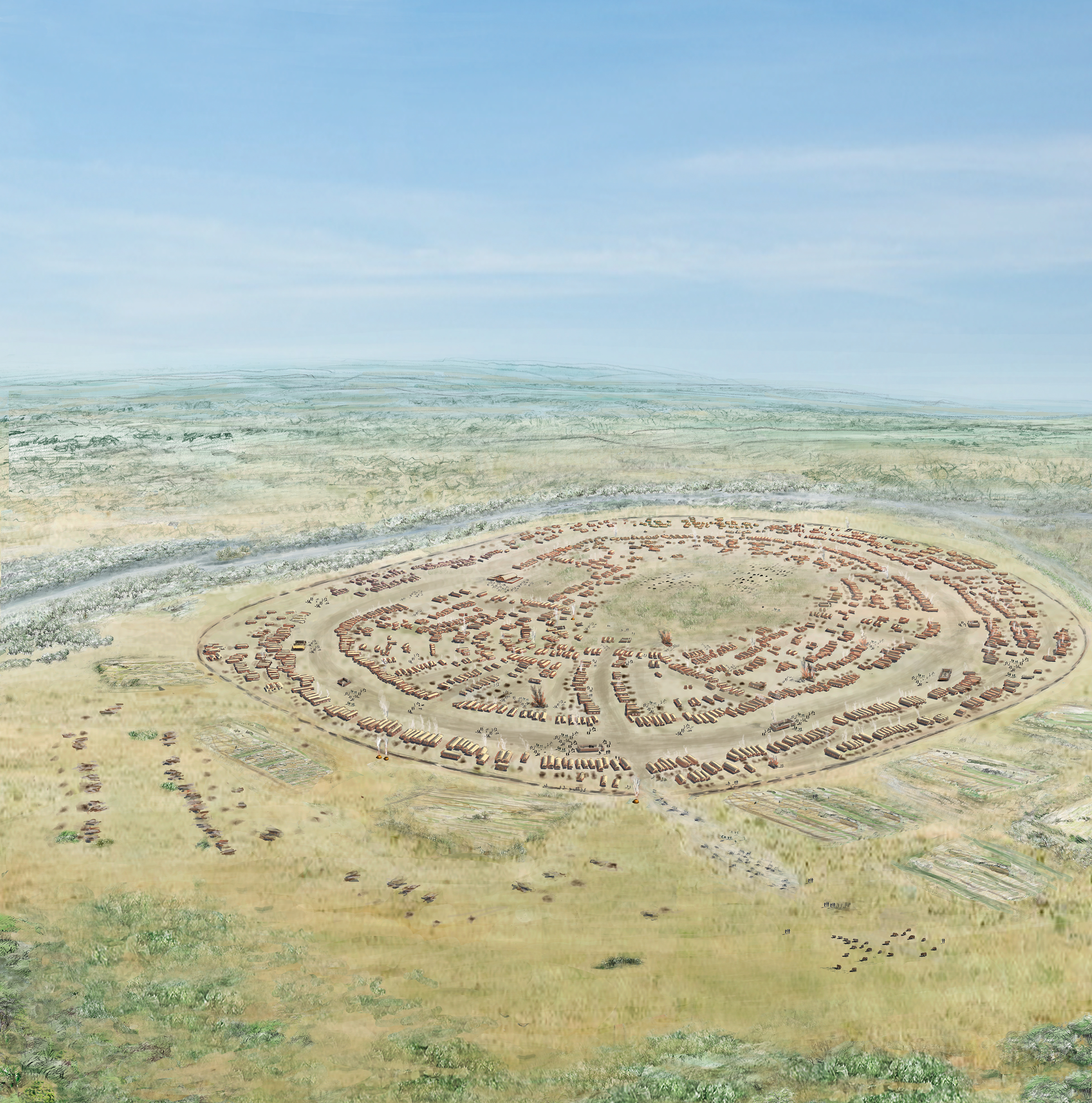
  Reconstruction of the main occupation phase of the Maidanetske mega-site, c. 3800 BC
  - La Hoguette culture (France, 6th millennium BC)
  - Körös culture (Hungary, Romania, 6th millennium BC)
  - La Almagra pottery culture (Andalusia, 6th to 5th millennium BC)
  - Linear Pottery culture (6th to 5th millennium BC)
    - Circular enclosures
  - Sopot culture (Croatia, Hungary, 6th to 4th millennium BC)
  - Vinča culture (Balkans, 6th to 5th millennium BC)
  - Cucuteni-Trypillian culture (Moldova, Ukraine, Romania, 6th to 3rd millennium BC)
  - Tisza culture (Central Europe, 6th to 5th millennium BC)
  - Langweiler (Germany, 6th to 5th millennium BC)
  - Hamangia culture (Romania, Bulgaria, 6th to 5th millennium BC)
  - Butmir culture (Bosnia and Herzegovina, 6th to 5th millennium BC)
  - Bonu Ighinu culture (Sardinia, 6th to 5th millennium BC)
  - Għar Dalam phase (Malta, 5th millennium BC)
  - Lengyel culture (Central Europe, 5th millennium BC)
    - A culture in Central Europe produced monumental arrangements of circular ditches between 4800 BC and 4600 BC.
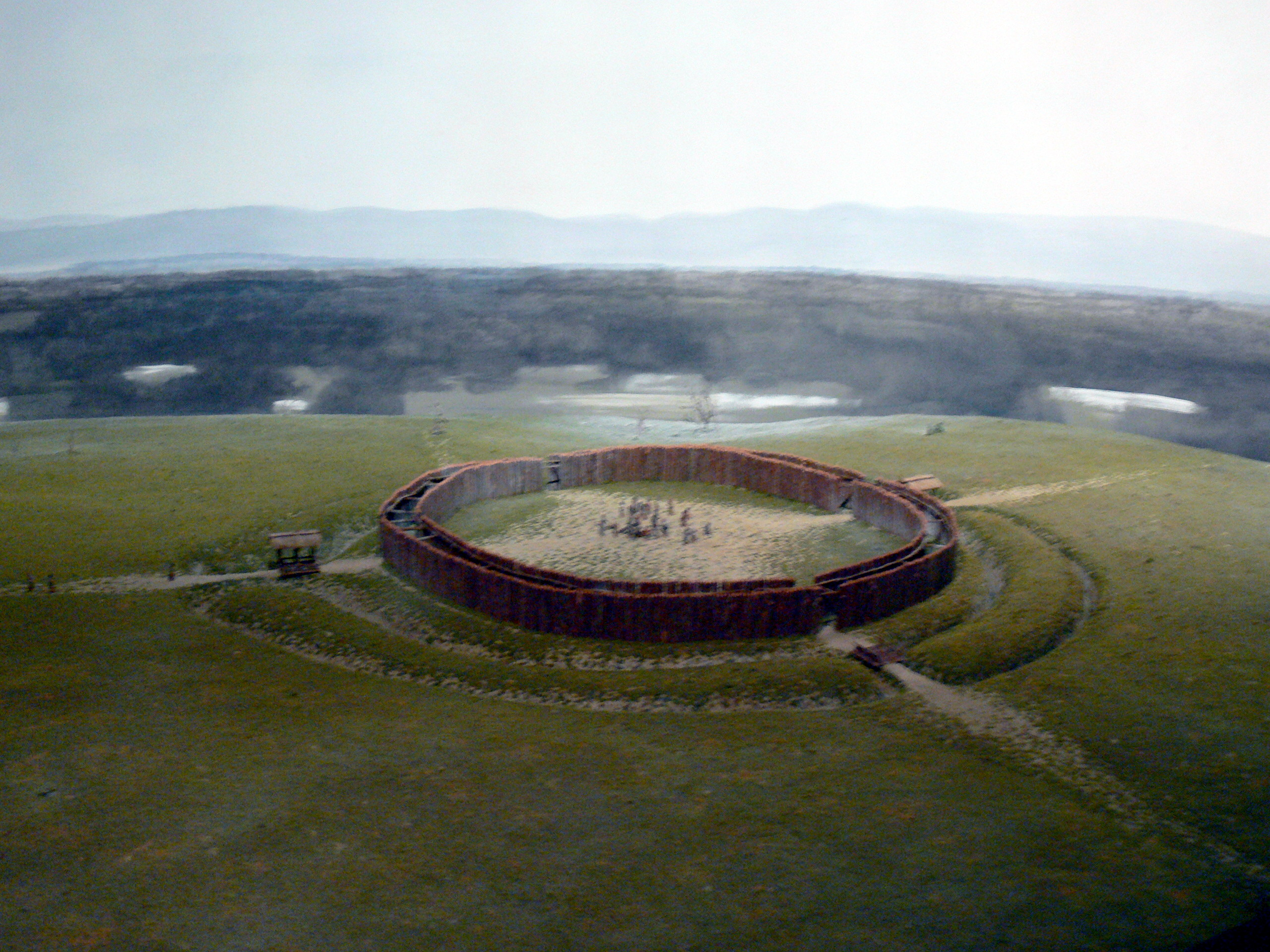
      Reconstruction (model) of the Künzing-Unternberg circular ditch, Museum Quintana, Künzing, Lower Bavaria, Germany
  - Hinkelstein culture (Germany, 5th millennium BC)
  - Stroke-ornamented ware culture (5th millennium BC)
  - Dimini culture (Greece, 5th to 4th millennium BC)
  - Cerny culture (France, 5th millennium BC)
  - Danilo culture (Croatia, 5th to 4th millennium BC)
  - Rössen culture (Central Europe, 5th millennium BC)
  - San Ciriaco culture (Sardinia, 5th millennium BC)
  - Chasséen culture (France, 5th to 4th millennium BC)
  - Sredny Stog culture (Ukraine, Russia, 5th to 4th millennium BC)
  - Michelsberg culture (Central Europe, 5th to 4th millennium BC)
  - Boian culture (Romania, Bulgaria, 5th to 4th millennium BC)
  - Pfyn culture (Switzerland, 5th to 4th millennium BC)
  - Pit–Comb Ware culture, a.k.a. Comb Ceramic culture (Northeast Europe, 5th to 3rd millennium BC)
  - Mariupol culture (Pontic Steppe, 5th millennium BC)
  - Hembury culture (Britain, 5th to 4th millennium BC)
  - Baalberge group (Germany, Czechia, 4th millennium BC)
  - Cortaillod culture (Switzerland, 4th millennium BC)
  - Mondsee group (Austria, 4th to 3rd millennium BC)
  - Horgen culture (Switzerland, 4th to 3rd millennium BC)
  - Hvar culture (Eastern Adriatic coast, 4th to 3rd millennium BC)
  - Windmill Hill culture (Britain, 4th millennium BC)
- Eneolithic (Chalcolithic)
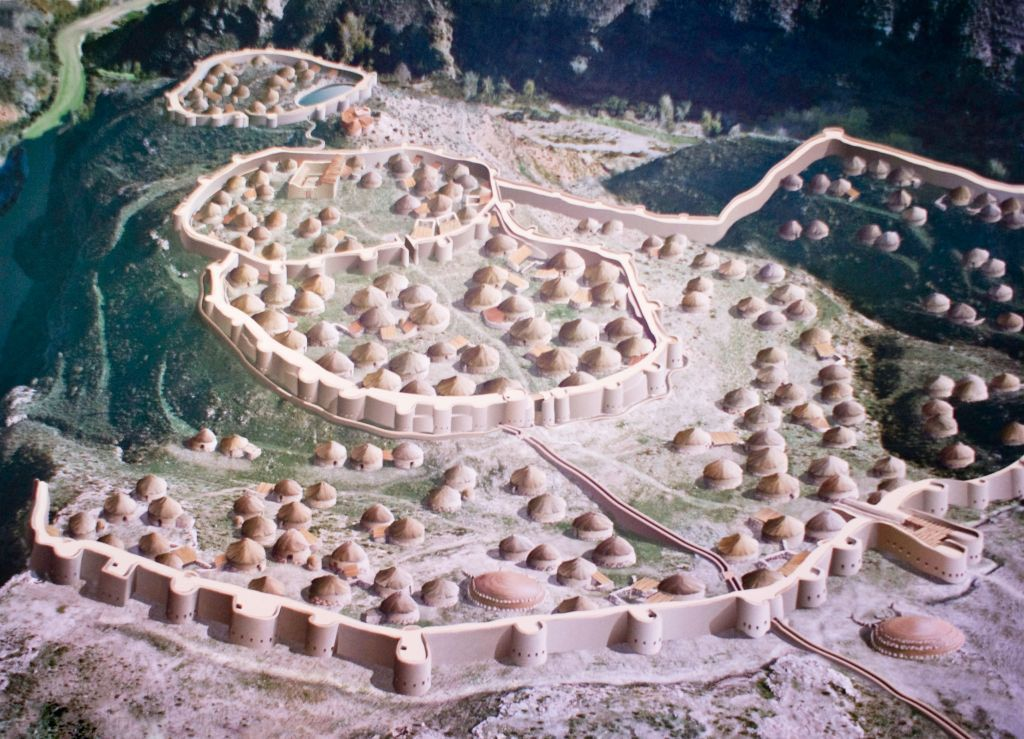
  A model of the prehistoric town of Los Millares, with its walls (Andalusia, Spain)
  - Samara culture (Russia, 5th millennium BC)
  - Khvalynsk culture (Russia, 5th to 4th millennium BC)
  - Gumelniţa culture (Romania, 5th millennium BC)
  - Varna culture (Bulgaria, 5th millennium BC)
  - Tiszapolgár culture (Central Europe, 5th millennium BC)
  - Suvorovo culture (North-west Black Sea, 5th millennium BC)
  - Novodanilovka culture (Ukraine, 5th to 4th millennium BC)
  - Funnelbeaker culture (5th to 3rd millennium BC)
  - Cernavodă culture (Bulgaria, Romania, 5th to 4th millennium BC)
  - Repin culture (East European forest steppe, 4th millennium BC)
  - Rinaldone culture (Italy, 4th to 3rd millennium BC)
  - Baden culture (Central Europe, 4th to 3rd millennium BC)
  - Usatove culture (North-west Black Sea, 4th to 3rd millennium BC)
  - Globular Amphora culture (Central Europe, 4th to 3rd millennium BC)
  - Yamnaya culture (Pontic-Caspian steppe, 4th to 3rd millennium BC)
  - Eutresis culture (Greece, 4th to 3rd millennium BC)
  - Vučedol culture (North-west Balkans, Pannonian Plain, late 4th to 3rd millennium BC)
  - Los Millares culture (Almería, Spain, 4th to 2nd millennium BC)
  - Corded Ware culture, a.k.a. Battle-axe or Single Grave culture (Northern Europe, 3rd millennium BC)
  - Gaudo culture (Italy, 4th to 3rd millennium BC, early Bronze Age)
  - Beaker culture (3rd to 2nd millennium BC, early Bronze Age)
    - Stonehenge, Skara Brae

=== Megalithic ===
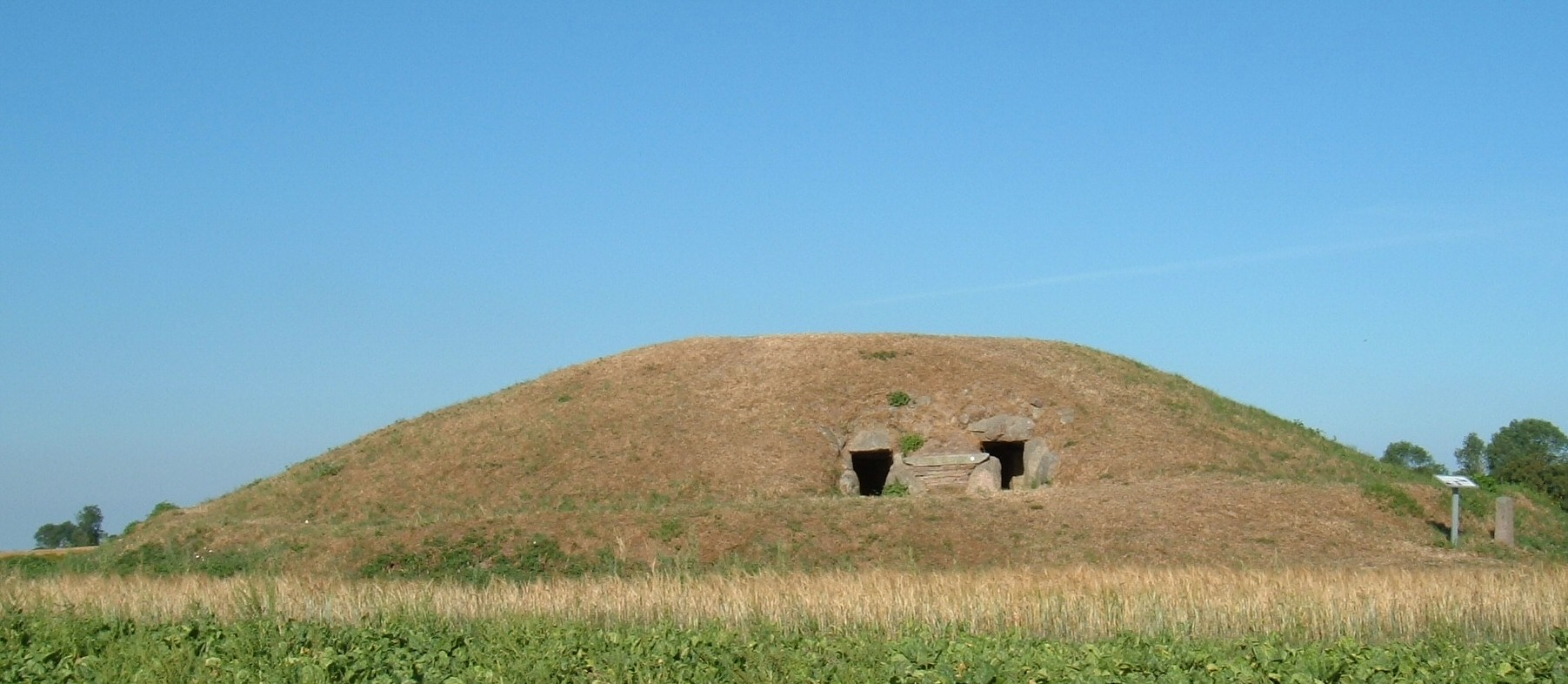
Klekkende Høj passage grave, Denmark, c. 3500-2800 BC

Some Neolithic cultures listed above are known for constructing megaliths. These occur primarily on the Atlantic coast of Europe, but there are also megaliths on western Mediterranean islands.

- c. 5000 BC: Constructions in Portugal (Évora). Emergence of the Atlantic Neolithic period, the age of agriculture along the fertile shores of Europe.
- c. 4800 BC: Constructions in Brittany (Barnenez) and Poitou (Bougon).
- c. 4000 BC: Constructions in Brittany (Carnac), Portugal (Lisbon), Spain (Galicia and Andalusia), France (central and southern), Corsica, England, Wales, Northern Ireland (Banbridge) and elsewhere.
- c. 3700 BC: Constructions in Ireland (Carrowmore and elsewhere) and Spain (Dolmen of Menga, Antequera Dolmens Site, Málaga).
- c. 3600 BC: Constructions in England (Maumbury Rings and Godmanchester), and Malta (Ġgantija and Mnajdra temples).
- c. 3500 BC: Constructions in Spain (Dolmen of Viera, Antequera Dolmens Site, Málaga, and Guadiana), Ireland (south-west), France (Arles and the north), north-west and central Italy (Piedmont, Valle d'Aosta, Liguria and Tuscany), Mediterranean islands (Sardinia, Sicily, Malta) and elsewhere in the Mediterranean, Belgium (north-east) and Germany (central and south-west).
- c. 3400 BC: Constructions in Ireland (Newgrange), Netherlands (north-east), Germany (northern and central) Sweden and Denmark.
- c. 3200 BC: Constructions in Malta (Ħaġar Qim and Tarxien).
- c. 3000 BC: Constructions in France (Saumur, Dordogne, Languedoc, Biscay, and the Mediterranean coast), Spain (Los Millares), Belgium (Ardennes), and Orkney, as well as the first henges (circular earthworks) in Britain.
- c. 2900 BC: Constructions in Spain (Tholos of El Romeral, Antequera Dolmens Site, Málaga)
- c. 2800 BC: Construction of the henge at Stonehenge.

== See also ==
- Prehistoric Europe
- Chalcolithic Europe
- Germanic substrate hypothesis
- Indo-Iranians
- Neolithic tomb
- Old European culture
- Pre-Indo-European languages
- Proto-Indo-European language
- Proto-Indo-Europeans
- Vinča symbols
- Neolithic in Switzerland

== Sources ==
- Aikio, Ante (2004). "An essay on substrate studies and the origin of Saami". In Hyvärinen, Irma; Kallio, Petri; Korhonen, Jarmo (eds.). Etymologie, Entlehnungen und Entwicklungen [Etymology, loanwords and developments]. Mémoires de la Société Néophilologique de Helsinki (in German). Vol. 63. Helsinki: Société Néophilologique. pp. 5–34. ISBN 978-951-9040-19-6.
- Ammerman, A. J.; Cavalli-Sforza, L. L. (1971). "Measuring the Rate of Spread of Early Farming in Europe". Man. 6 (4): 674–88. doi:10.2307/2799190. JSTOR 2799190.
- Anthony, David W. (2007). The Horse, the Wheel, and Language: How Bronze-Age Riders from the Eurasian Steppes Shaped the Modern World. Princeton University Press. ISBN 978-0-691-05887-0.
- Balaresque, Patricia; Bowden, Georgina R.; Adams, Susan M.; Leung, Ho-Yee; King, Turi E.; Rosser, Zoë H.; Goodwin, Jane; Moisan, Jean-Paul; Richard, Christelle; Millward, Ann; Demaine, Andrew G.; Barbujani, Guido; Previderè, Carlo; Wilson, Ian J.; Tyler-Smith, Chris; Jobling, Mark A. (2010). Penny, David (ed.). "A Predominantly Neolithic Origin for European Paternal Lineages". PLOS Biology. 8 (1) e1000285. doi:10.1371/journal.pbio.1000285. PMC 2799514. PMID 20087410.
  - Ian Sample (19 January 2010). "Most British men are descended from ancient farmers". The Guardian.
- Barbujani, Guido; Bertorelle, Giorgio; Chikhi, Lounès (1998). "Evidence for Paleolithic and Neolithic Gene Flow in Europe". The American Journal of Human Genetics. 62 (2): 488–92. doi:10.1086/301719. PMC 1376895. PMID 9463326.
- Bar-Yosef, Ofer (1998). "The Natufian culture in the Levant, threshold to the origins of agriculture". Evolutionary Anthropology: Issues, News, and Reviews. 6 (5): 159–77. doi:10.1002/(SICI)1520-6505(1998)6:5<159::AID-EVAN4>3.0.CO;2-7. S2CID 35814375.
- Battaglia, Vincenza; Fornarino, Simona; Al-Zahery, Nadia; Olivieri, Anna; Pala, Maria; Myres, Natalie M; King, Roy J; Rootsi, Siiri; Marjanovic, Damir; Primorac, Dragan; Hadziselimovic, Rifat; Vidovic, Stojko; Drobnic, Katia; Durmishi, Naser; Torroni, Antonio; Santachiara-Benerecetti, A Silvana; Underhill, Peter A; Semino, Ornella (2008). "Y-chromosomal evidence of the cultural diffusion of agriculture in southeast Europe". European Journal of Human Genetics. 17 (6): 820–30. doi:10.1038/ejhg.2008.249. PMC 2947100. PMID 19107149.
- Bellwood, Peter (2004). First Farmers: The Origins of Agricultural Societies. Blackwell Publishers. ISBN 978-0-631-20566-1.
- Brace, C. Loring; Seguchi, Noriko; Quintyn, Conrad B.; Fox, Sherry C.; Nelson, A. Russell; Manolis, Sotiris K.; Qifeng, Pan (2005). "The questionable contribution of the Neolithic and the Bronze Age to European craniofacial form". Proceedings of the National Academy of Sciences. 103 (1): 242–7. Bibcode:2006PNAS..103..242B. doi:10.1073/pnas.0509801102. JSTOR 30048282. PMC 1325007. PMID 16371462.
- Busby, George B. J.; Brisighelli, Francesca; Sánchez-Diz, Paula; Ramos-Luis, Eva; Martinez-Cadenas, Conrado; Thomas, Mark G.; Bradley, Daniel G.; Gusmão, Leonor; Winney, Bruce; Bodmer, Walter; Vennemann, Marielle; Coia, Valentina; Scarnicci, Francesca; Tofanelli, Sergio; Vona, Giuseppe; Ploski, Rafal; Vecchiotti, Carla; Zemunik, Tatijana; Rudan, Igor; Karachanak, Sena; Toncheva, Draga; Anagnostou, Paolo; Ferri, Gianmarco; Rapone, Cesare; Hervig, Tor; Moen, Torolf; Wilson, James F.; Capelli, Cristian (2011). "The peopling of Europe and the cautionary tale of Y chromosome lineage R-M269". Proceedings of the Royal Society B: Biological Sciences. 279 (1730): 884–92. doi:10.1098/rspb.2011.1044. PMC 3259916. PMID 21865258.
- Cavalli-Sforza, LL (1997). "Genes, peoples, and languages". Proceedings of the National Academy of Sciences of the United States of America. 94 (15): 7719–24. Bibcode:1997PNAS...94.7719C. doi:10.1073/pnas.94.15.7719. PMC 33682. PMID 9223254.
- Chikhi, L.; Destro-Bisol, G.; Bertorelle, G.; Pascali, V.; Barbujani, G. (1998). "Clines of nuclear DNA markers suggest a largely Neolithic ancestry of the European gene pool". Proceedings of the National Academy of Sciences. 95 (15): 9053–8. Bibcode:1998PNAS...95.9053C. doi:10.1073/pnas.95.15.9053. JSTOR 45884. PMC 21201. PMID 9671803.
- Cruciani, F.; et al. (2007). "Tracing past human male movements in northern/eastern Africa and western Eurasia: new clues from Y-chromosomal haplogroups E-M78 and J-M12". Molecular Biology and Evolution. 24 (6): 1300–1311. doi:10.1093/molbev/msm049. PMID 17351267.
- Derenko, Miroslava; Malyarchuk, Boris; Denisova, Galina; Perkova, Maria; Rogalla, Urszula; Grzybowski, Tomasz; Khusnutdinova, Elza; Dambueva, Irina; Zakharov, Ilia (2012). Kivisild, Toomas (ed.). "Complete Mitochondrial DNA Analysis of Eastern Eurasian Haplogroups Rarely Found in Populations of Northern Asia and Eastern Europe". PLOS ONE. 7 (2) e32179. Bibcode:2012PLoSO...732179D. doi:10.1371/journal.pone.0032179. PMC 3283723. PMID 22363811.
- Di Giacomo, F.; Luca, F.; Popa, L. O.; Akar, N.; Anagnou, N.; Banyko, J.; Brdicka, R.; Barbujani, G.; Papola, F.; Ciavarella, G.; Cucci, F.; Di Stasi, L.; Gavrila, L.; Kerimova, M. G.; Kovatchev, D.; Kozlov, A. I.; Loutradis, A.; Mandarino, V.; Mammi', C.; Michalodimitrakis, E. N.; Paoli, G.; Pappa, K. I.; Pedicini, G.; Terrenato, L.; Tofanelli, S.; Malaspina, P.; Novelletto, A. (2004). "Y chromosomal haplogroup J as a signature of the post-neolithic colonization of Europe". Human Genetics. 115 (5): 357–71. doi:10.1007/s00439-004-1168-9. PMID 15322918. S2CID 18482536.
- Dokládal, Milan; Brožek, Josef (1961). "Physical Anthropology in Czechoslovakia: Recent Developments". Current Anthropology. 2 (5): 455–77. doi:10.1086/200228. JSTOR 2739787. S2CID 161324951.
- Dupanloup, I.; Bertorelle, G; Chikhi, L; Barbujani, G (2004). "Estimating the Impact of Prehistoric Admixture on the Genome of Europeans". Molecular Biology and Evolution. 21 (7): 1361–72. doi:10.1093/molbev/msh135. PMID 15044595. S2CID 17665038.
- Häkkinen, Jaakko (2012). "Early contacts between Uralic and Yukaghir" (PDF). Suomalais-Ugrilaisen Seuran Toimituksia − Mémoires de la Société Finno-Ougrienne (264): 91–101.
- Lacan, Marie; Keyser, Christine; Ricaut, François-Xavier; Brucato, Nicolas; Tarrus, Josep; Bosch, Angel; Guilaine, Jean; Crubezy, Eric; Ludes, Bertrand (2011). "Ancient DNA suggests the leading role played by men in the Neolithic dissemination". Proceedings of the National Academy of Sciences. 108 (45): 18255–9. Bibcode:2011PNAS..10818255L. doi:10.1073/pnas.1113061108. PMC 3215063. PMID 22042855.
- Renfrew, Colin (1987). Archaeology and Language. London: Jonathan Cape. ISBN 978-0-521-38675-3.
- Ricaut, F. X.; Waelkens, M. (2008). "Cranial Discrete Traits in a Byzantine Population and Eastern Mediterranean Population Movements". Human Biology. 80 (5): 535–64. doi:10.3378/1534-6617-80.5.535. PMID 19341322. S2CID 25142338.
- Richards, M; Côrte-Real, H; Forster, P; MacAulay, V; Wilkinson-Herbots, H; Demaine, A; Papiha, S; Hedges, R; Bandelt, HJ; Sykes, B (1996). "Paleolithic and neolithic lineages in the European mitochondrial gene pool". American Journal of Human Genetics. 59 (1): 185–203. PMC 1915109. PMID 8659525.
- Ringe, Don (6 January 2009). "The Linguistic Diversity of Aboriginal Europe". Language Log. Mark Liberman.
- Rosser, Zoë H.; Zerjal, Tatiana; Hurles, Matthew E.; Adojaan, Maarja; Alavantic, Dragan; Amorim, António; Amos, William; Armenteros, Manuel; Arroyo, Eduardo; Barbujani, Guido; Beckman, G; Beckman, L; Bertranpetit, J; Bosch, E; Bradley, DG; Brede, G; Cooper, G; Côrte-Real, HB; De Knijff, P; Decorte, R; Dubrova, YE; Evgrafov, O; Gilissen, A; Glisic, S; Gölge, M; Hill, EW; Jeziorowska, A; Kalaydjieva, L; Kayser, M; Kivisild, T (2000). "Y-Chromosomal Diversity in Europe is Clinal and Influenced Primarily by Geography, Rather than by Language". The American Journal of Human Genetics. 67 (6): 1526–43. doi:10.1086/316890. PMC 1287948. PMID 11078479.
- Semino, Ornella; Magri, Chiara; Benuzzi, Giorgia; Lin, Alice A.; Al-Zahery, Nadia; Battaglia, Vincenza; MacCioni, Liliana; Triantaphyllidis, Costas; Shen, Peidong; Oefner, Peter J.; Zhivotovsky, Lev A.; King, Roy; Torroni, Antonio; Cavalli-Sforza, L. Luca; Underhill, Peter A.; Santachiara-Benerecetti, A. Silvana (2004). "Origin, Diffusion, and Differentiation of Y-Chromosome Haplogroups E and J: Inferences on the Neolithization of Europe and Later Migratory Events in the Mediterranean Area". The American Journal of Human Genetics. 74 (5): 1023–34. doi:10.1086/386295. PMC 1181965. PMID 15069642.
- Semino, O.; Passarino, G; Oefner, PJ; Lin, AA; Arbuzova, S; Beckman, LE; De Benedictis, G; Francalacci, P; Kouvatsi, A; Limborska, S; Marcikiae, M; Mika, A; Mika, B; Primorac, D; Santachiara-Benerecetti, AS; Cavalli-Sforza, LL; Underhill, PA (2000). "The Genetic Legacy of Paleolithic Homo sapiens sapiens in Extant Europeans: A Y Chromosome Perspective". Science. 290 (5494): 1155–9. Bibcode:2000Sci...290.1155S. doi:10.1126/science.290.5494.1155. PMID 11073453.
- Shennan, Stephen; Edinborough, Kevan (2007). "Prehistoric population history: From the Late Glacial to the Late Neolithic in Central and Northern Europe". Journal of Archaeological Science. 34 (8): 1339–45. Bibcode:2007JArSc..34.1339S. doi:10.1016/j.jas.2006.10.031.
- Subbaraman, Nidhi (2012). "Art of cheese-making is 7,500 years old". Nature. doi:10.1038/nature.2012.12020. S2CID 180646880.
- Haak, Wolfgang; Forster, Peter; Bramanti, Barbara; Matsumura, Shuichi; Brandt, Guido; Tänzer, Marc; Villems, Richard; Renfrew, Colin; et al. (2005). "Ancient DNA from the First European Farmers in 7500-Year-Old Neolithic Sites". Science. 310 (5750): 1016–8. Bibcode:2005Sci...310.1016H. doi:10.1126/science.1118725. ISSN 1095-9203. PMID 16284177. S2CID 11546893.
- Zvelebil, Marek (1989). "On the transition to farming in Europe, or what was spreading with the Neolithic: a reply to Ammerman (1989)". Antiquity. 63 (239): 379–83. doi:10.1017/S0003598X00076110. S2CID 162882505.
- Zvelebil, Marek (2009). "Mesolithic prelude and neolithic revolution". In Zvelebil, Marek (ed.). Hunters in Transition: Mesolithic Societies of Temperate Eurasia and Their Transition to Farming. Cambridge University Press. pp. 5–15. ISBN 978-0-521-10957-4.
- Zvelebil, Marek (2009). "Mesolithic societies and the transition to farming: problems of time, scale and organisation". In Zvelebil, Marek (ed.). Hunters in Transition: Mesolithic Societies of Temperate Eurasia and Their Transition to Farming. Cambridge University Press. pp. 167–88. ISBN 978-0-521-10957-4.
