= San Ciriaco culture =

Sardinian archaeological culture

The San Ciriaco culture, sometimes also called San Ciriaco Phase, is a middle Neolithic, pre-Nuragic culture from Sardinia and roughly dates to the second half of the 5th millennium BC (4500-4000 BC). It is named after a locality in the territory of Terralba, in the province of Oristano.

The economy of the San Ciriaco people was predominantly agricultural using the same plant and animal species as the preceding Bonu Ighinu culture. San Ciriaco ceramics encompass well-fired and thin-walled vessels with polished surfaces varying in colour from beige to black. Vessels exhibit angular or carinated shapes, possess slightly rounded or flat bases, and are undecorated. At Monte Arci, larger workshops hint towards an intensified use of obsidian, while imported flint from the Gargano peninsula found in cist 1 of the Li Muri necropolis at Arzachena documents far reaching contacts.

While small artificial caves continued to be used for burials, now more elaborated underground rock-cut tombs, so called hypogea, were built, placing Sardinia well into the megalithic context of the western mediterranean. Some, like tomb 10 at Santa Pedru, reach a considerable size (15 x 7 m) and consist of five chambers. Stone cists covered by cairns were also built.

== See also ==
- Pre-Nuragic Sardinia
- Bonu Ighinu culture
- Ozieri culture

== Bibliography ==
- Giovanni, Ugas (2005). L'alba dei nuraghi (in Italian). Cagliari: Fabula editore.
- Gary Webster (2019). The Sardinian Neolithic: An Archaeology of the 6th and 5th Millennia BCE. BAR int. Ser. 2941. Oxford: BAR Publishing.
