= La Almagra pottery =

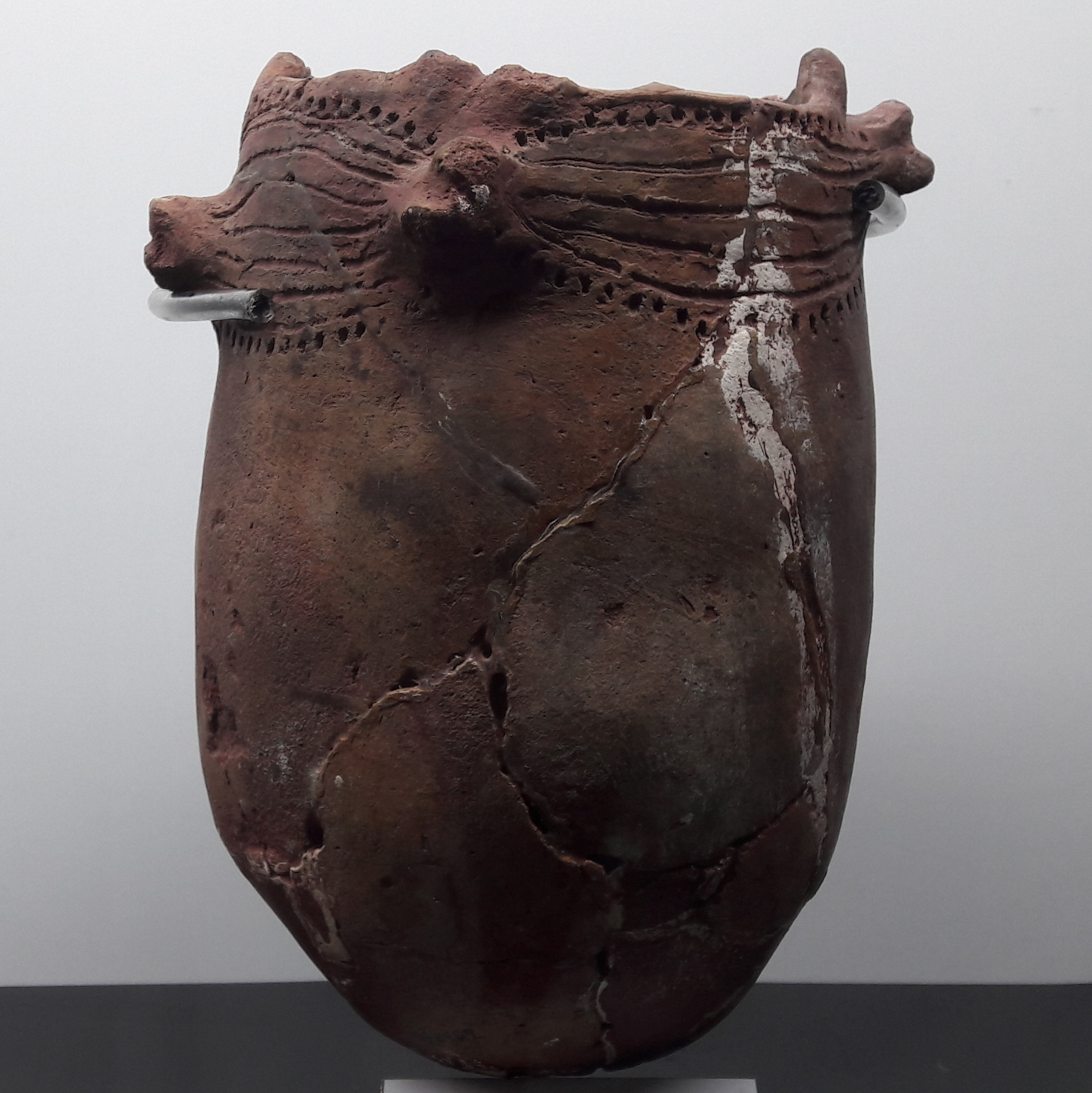

La Almagra (red ochre), also known as ″La Almagra Pottery culture″, is a red pottery found in a number of archaeological sites of the Neolithic period in Spain. It is not known how it relates to other pottery of the Neolithic period.

In the sixth millennium BC Andalusia experienced the arrival of the first agriculturalists. The origin of these first agriculturalists is uncertain, and although North Africa is a serious candidate, desertification there in the few centuries immediately prior to the arrival of the agriculturalists in Andalusia has made archaeological work on possibly related cultures of North Africa very difficult. For now, the North African cultures remain little understood, with possible material remains lost to the sands or coasts. However, the first Agriculturalists arrived in Andalusia with crops such as domesticated forms of cereals and legumes already developed. The presence of domestic animals is uncertain, but remains of domestic species of pig and rabbit known later have been found in large quantities, although these could belong to wild animals. The agriculturalists also consumed many olives, but it is uncertain whether the olive was cultivated or harvested in its wild form. A typical artifact of the first agriculturalists is the La Almagra style pottery, quite variegated.

The cultures of the Andalusian Neolithic spread, for example, to Southern Portugal, where the first dolmen tombs appeared c.4800 BC, possibly the oldest of their kind anywhere.

Ca. 4700 BC Cardium Pottery Neolithic culture (also known as Mediterranean Neolithic) reached Eastern Iberia.

Studies have sought a source for the earliest occurrences of La Almagra pottery in the Near East, for example Anatolian and northern Syrian locations. In this view, the origin of the La Almagra pottery type is early Ugarit, dating from between 2400 and 2300 BC. From these localities it probably migrated to Cyprus. Alternatively, it has been posited that elements of the pottery derive from the colouration and fabrication technique of the Diana style of Lipari (final phase of the Neolithic of Lipari), although the shapes of the two types of pottery are very different. However, the sixth millennium BC radiocarbon dates confirmed for the archaeological context of the earliest occurrences of this pottery make such speculations untenable since these examples of La Almagra pottery occurred at least 3,000 years before their alleged prototypes in the east Mediterranean.
