= Bonu Ighinu culture =

Sardinian archaeological culture

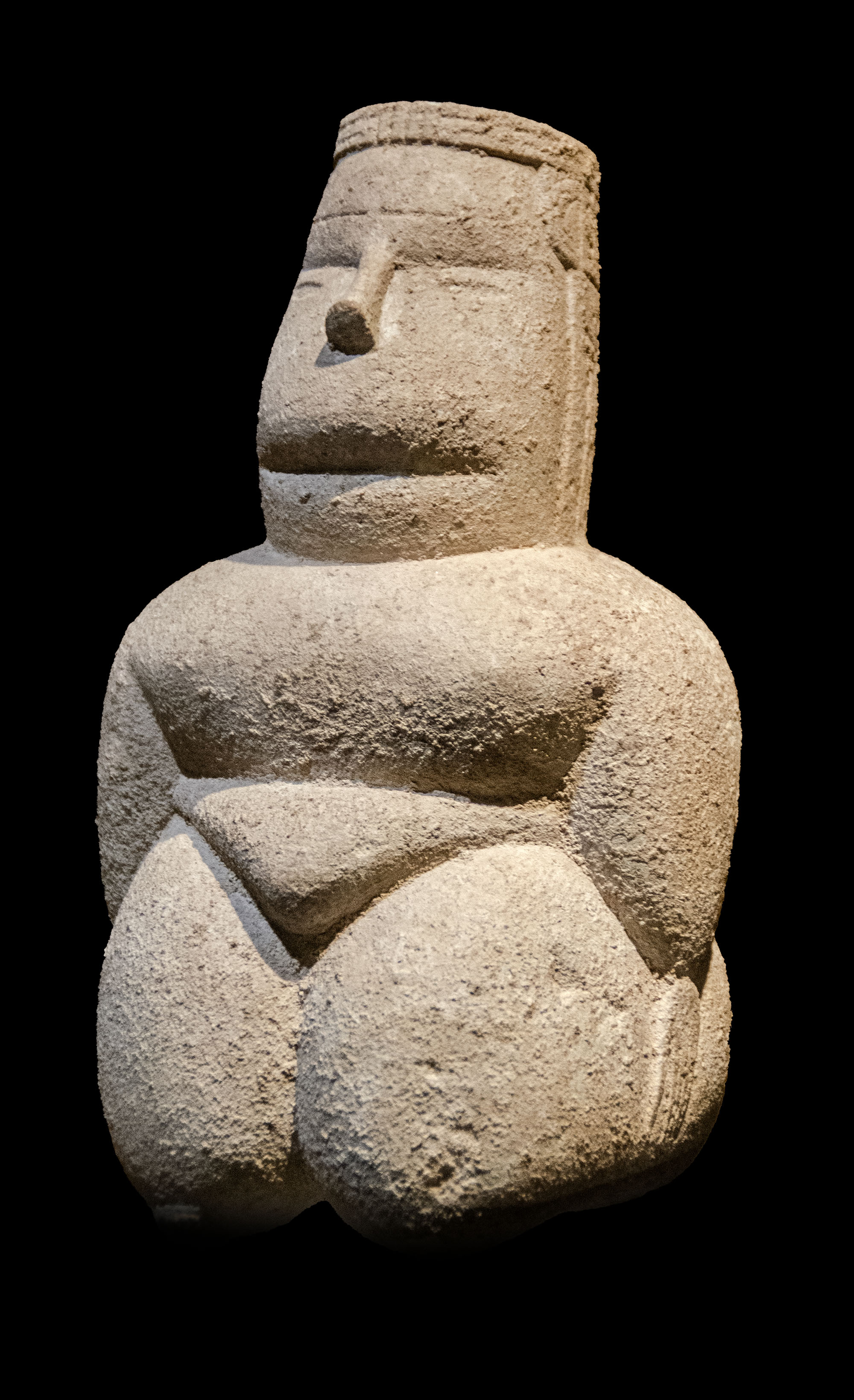
Bonu Ighinu Statuette, c. 4500 BC

The Bonuighinu culture or Bonu Ighinu culture, sometimes also called Bonu Ighinu Phase, is a middle Neolithic, pre-Nuragic culture from Sardinia and roughly dates to the first half of the 5th millennium BC (5100-4500 BC). It takes its name from a locality in the municipality of Mara, province of Sassari, where the cave of Sa de Ucca of Tintirriolu (the mouth of the bat) is located. The first Bonu Ighinu pottery was discovered here by Renato Loria and David H. Trump in 1971.

People of the Bonuighinu culture were the first in Sardinia to have used natural cavities as graves, which then formed small necropolis. The dead were buried in graves and in small artificial caves, oval and vaulted.

The subsistence agriculture was based on growing wheat, barley, peas, and lentils and keeping cattle, pigs, sheep, and goat. Local wild animals, like the extinct Sardinian pika, were also hunted. At least 45 sites are known all across the island, only avoiding the central upper valleys and the south eastern corner of the island. Bonu Ighinu pottery is mostly thin-walled and highly polished varying in colour from brown to dark grey. Most vessels possess a round base and especially bowls exhibit characteristically flared collars. Decorations executed in micro-point impressions or engraved lines depict festoons and other geometric symbols. The use of obsidian from Monte Arci is documented from several sites. Remains of a large (12 x 6 m) possible oval pit-house were discovered at Cucurru S'Arriu-Cabras.

== See also ==
- Prehistoric Europe

== Bibliography ==
- Loria, Renato; David H. Trump (1978). Le scoperte a Sa 'ucca de su Tintirriolu e il neolitico sardo. Roma: Accademia nazionale dei Lincei.
- Antonio Funedda; Giacomo Oggiano; Sandro Pasci (2000). "The Logudoro basin: a key area for the tertiary tectono-sedimentary evolution of North Sardinia". Bollettino della Società Geologica Italiana. 119 (1): 31–38.
- Sanna I.; Sanna L. (2001). "La grotta di Lu Sorigu Antigu". Speleologia (45).
- David H. Trump (1983). "La grotta di Filiestru a Bonu Ighinu, Mara (SS)". Quaderni della Soprintendenza AI Beni Archeologici Sassari e Nuoro (13).
- A. Foschi (1982). "Il neolitico antico della grotta di Sa Korona di Monte Maiore, (Thiesi-Sassari)". Acte du Coloque Internazionale Prèhistoire (Montpellier, 1981).
- Gary Webster (2019). The Sardinian Neolithic: An Archaeology of the 6th and 5th Millennia BCE. BAR int. Ser. 2941. Oxford: BAR Publishing.
