= Crkvine =

Crkvine may refer to:

- Crkvine (Mladenovac), a village in Mladenovac, Serbia
- Crkvine (Stubline), a Neolithic locality in Stubline, Serbia
- Crkvine (Tutin), a village in Tutin, Serbia

== See also ==
- Crkvina (disambiguation)
