= Flores (company) =

Distillery in Divostin, Serbia

- Official logo
- Native name: Флорес
- Company type: LLC
- Industry: Beverages wholesale
- Founded: 8 July 1992; 33 years ago (Current form)
- Headquarters: Divostin bb, Kragujevac, Serbia
- Area served: Worldwide
- Key people: Miomir Pljakić (Director)
- Revenue: ▲€0.40 million (2017)
- Net income: ▼€0.030 million (2017)
- Total assets: ▲€0.64 million (2017)
- Total equity: ▲€0.60 million (2017)
- Number of employees: 5 (2017)
- Website: www.flores.rs

Flores (Serbian Cyrillic: Флорес) is a Serbian company producing alcoholic beverages, mainly rakija, with headquarters in Divostin, Kragujevac. It was established in 1985. Its most renowned product is Žuta osa ("Yellow Wasp"), high-quality slivovitz.

== History ==
Flores was founded in 1985 by agricultural engineer Radiša Pljakić, based on his previous experience in company "Miloduh", producing macerated brandies, which he helped establish back in 1970 and made into one of the most renowned companies in the industry in former Yugoslavia. In 1979, Pljakić left the company and worked in several public agricultural institutions. In 1985, he decided to take an opportunity arising from new legal regulation, and started a private business solely on his own. On the family homestead in Divostin he established "Flores", one of the first private companies in Yugoslavia, and according to Pljakić, it was the very first.

The company produces 100–150,000 bottles of liquor annually, over half of which is being exported to the United States, Australia and elsewhere in the world. Its most renowned brand, Žuta osa (Yellow Wasp), a natural slivovitz 45 abv, has won 13 gold medals in exhibitions and fairs across the world. "Žuta osa superior", aged 8 years in oak barrels, is produced in smaller series at higher prices. Other liquors by the company include "Bela osa" (White Wasp), "Srpska Loza" (pomace brandy) and "Lincura" (Gentiana macerated in slivovitz). Miomir Pljakić took over the company once his father retired.

"Flores" operates from a plant in Divostin equipped with a modern processing and packaging plant and quality-control laboratory, while the aging cellar is placed in the nearby village of Kamenica.
