= Crkvine (Stubline) =

Archaeological site

- Црквине (Serbian)
- Location within Serbia
- 44.563761°N 20.125787°E
- Type: Settlement
- Periods: Neolithic
- Cultures: Vinča culture, Old Europe
- Location: Serbia
- Region: Kolubara region (geographically); City of Belgrade (administratively)

History
- Built: c. 4800 BC
- Abandoned: c. 4600 BC

Site notes
- Area: 16.5 ha (41 acres)
- Excavation dates: 1962–1970, 2008–
- Archaeologists: Jovan Todorović (1967)
- Condition: buried

Crkvine (Serbian Cyrillic: Црквине, romanized: Church ground) is a Neolithic locality and an archaeological site in the village of Stubline in the municipality of Obrenovac, in Serbia's capital Belgrade. The Neolithic settlement is dated to the 5th millennium BC and was part of the Vinča culture. The research of the site began in 1962 and the locality was declared a cultural monument in 2014.

The site gives an unprecedented possibility of researching the architecture and urbanism of the Vinča culture as it marks the previously unrecorded and unique settlement type of this cultural group. Taking into account its geographical position, a regular street-like layout of houses, close economic and, presumably, social connections with the surrounding contemporary settlements and beyond, the Crkvine settlement appears to be a "burgeoning proto-urban society", in the region bounded by three rivers, the Sava, Kolubara and Tamnava.

== Location ==
Crkvine is located in the village of Stubline, which is part of the Obrenovac municipality, which in turn administratively belongs to Belgrade. It is 14 km (8.7 mi) southeast of its municipal seat of Obrenovac, and 40 km (25 mi) in the same direction from Belgrade. As of 2018, there are some 90 archaeological sites on the territory of the Obrenovac municipality, 13 of which are dated to the Neolithic.

Crkvine is situated on a mild slope, bounded by the creeks of Izvorac and Trstenica. Today, the location is surrounded by cornfields as the modern Stubline village developed a bit further from it. The plateau on which the settlement was built is elevated from the surrounding areas, on the feature called Dren Elevation (Drenski vis), named after the nearby village of Dren. The locality is on the very edge of Dren Elevation, which itself is 115 to 120 m (377 to 394 ft) high and classified as a deluvial-proluvial plain. It is a secondary river terrace, remains of an old bank of the river Sava which flowed along the Dren Elevation a long time ago, before turning to the present route (roughly 10 kilometres (6.2 mi) to the north).

The plateau is 500 m (1,600 ft) long while it is 380 m (1,250 ft) wide on the western and 130 m (430 ft) on the eastern end. Despite the low elevation of the settlement locality, 92 to 112 m (302 to 367 ft), numerous distant mountains are visible: Avala, Kosmaj, Rudnik, Suvobor, Maljen, Povlen and Cer, while on the clear days the Stolovi can be seen, too. This allowed an exceptional visual communication with the areas to the south and east but, not with the areas to the north and west, where other Neolithic settlements were located.

== Name ==
The modern name of the locality, Crkvine, means the "church ground". It is based on the long-living myth that there was an old church on this spot. The legend was preserved from generation to generation and some writings from the 19th century seemingly confirm that there is an old church ground in Stubline. As the inhabitants believed in the story, for a long time the locality hasn't been cultivated. However, no remains of an actual church have been found so far.

== History ==
Just like the surrounding areas, the Crkvine was settled by the members of the Vinča culture. Archaeologists praise the "good choosing of the living place" of the Vinčans. It is believed that the settlement wasn't formed by several families and then spontaneously settled by more and more migrants, but that it was rather settled by a large number of people at once. The older settlement dates from 4700 BC. It occupies the eastern plateau, with some 120 houses, which were protected by the deeply dug double trenches, which presumably offered protection from numerous hazards: enemies, wild animals, flash floods by the surged streams, etc. Some 50 years after it was founded, the settlement spread on the western side of the plateau where further 80 houses were built in time.

After two centuries, the Vinčan communities in this area simply disappeared. It coincides with the vanishing of the entire Vinča culture c. 4600 BC. Though today much is known about the culture itself, the abrupt disappearance remains an enigma. Out of various theories, none is widely accepted.

== Exploration ==
The first written records which deal with the subject date from 1912, when the oldest villagers of Stubline still claimed the "old church" legend, but also had certain ideas of some human occupation from "ancient" times. The records were made by the teacher from Obrenovac, Vitomir Radovanović, who was archiving them in the school collections in the Stubline school and in the Archaeological Museum in Obrenovac. After the museum was closed in 1961, several hundred artifacts were stored in the Belgrade City Museum.

First artifacts originated from the damage done on the surface, by grave digging or land cultivation. During a small-scale archaeological survey conducted in 1962, the remains of the settlement were discovered. It was clear that the remains belong to the Vinča culture and that there was a potential for further exploration. The first proper archaeological exploration was conducted in 1967. It was headed by Jovan Todorović, a curator of the Belgrade City Museum. The exploration was on the small scale, and Todorović also explored the surrounding Neolithic localities, like Jasenje in Vukićevica, Đurića Vinogradi in Grabovac and Novo Selo, also In Stubline. However, the archaeological surveys and exploration stopped in 1970.

Works were continued with the tentative November 2006 excavation. Geomagnetic mapping and geo-electrical scanning were conducted from December 2007 to 2011. The mapping produced the pattern of almost entire settlement on an area of 16.5 ha (41 acres). Systematic archaeological exploration has continued since 2008. Of total area, the "urbanized" section covers 7.5 ha (19 acres). It was the first major mapping of this kind of any Late Vinča locality in the central Balkans. The northern section could not be mapped because of the vegetation and current village road. Also, as the area below the lowest point of the surrounding trench, 94 m (308 ft), has been regularly flooded until several decades ago, this area was not surveyed either as no building activity was expected on such terrain. As of 2018, explored objects include 5 houses, a primary trench system and the landfill on the southern slope of the locality. Head of the research was Zoran Simić.

At first, the precise dating was not available and from the pottery which was discovered, its features, analogy with other settlements and materials dated by the Carbon-14 method, the existence of the Crkvine settlement was placed between 5250 BC and 4600 BC. This was later narrowed to 4800 BC – 4600 BC.

On 8 October 2014 the locality was officially declared an archaeological site and placed under the state protection.

== Settlement ==
=== Layout ===
It was a large, lowland-type Vinča settlement which belongs to the Late Neolithic, Phase D-2 of the Vinča culture. In total, the settlement had at least 218 houses. The houses were built in rows, forming something of a street-like map. Some of the houses were built around smaller open areas, most likely a communal, public spaces. The houses are mostly rectangular, built from the mud-covered wooden construction. It is estimated that such a house, without major restorations, could last from 40 to 100 years. Sizes of the houses varied from 20 m^{2} (220 sq ft) to 100 m^{2} (1,100 sq ft), with the average size of 57.2 m^{2} (616 sq ft). There are 5 houses smaller than 20 m^{2} (220 sq ft) and 9 larger than 100 m^{2} (1,100 sq ft). This is the largest average house size in the Late Vinča period, except for the Divostin locality. The smallest houses are laid in opposite direction and it is believed that they were not used for dwelling being probably public storages, though the exact use is still unknown.

The conservative figures estimate the population anywhere between 1,000 and 2,000 inhabitants. Calculating that 5 to 7 people lived in one house, the population might be from 1,250 to 1,750. If all houses were contemporary, and given the fact that it is not known how many houses had upper floors, some estimates go up to 2,300, 3,500 or 4,000 people.

In the west, the hill on which is the settlement is separated from the ellipsoid, funnel-shaped depression which today covers an area of 110 m × 45 m × 2 m (360.9 ft × 147.6 ft × 6.6 ft). The origin of the depression is unknown, but such depressions are almost regular features next to many Vinča settlements. It has been suggested that these pits develop as the settlers take materials needed for the construction of the village.

Some 95% of the objects were built in the north-south direction, but several were oriented in the east-west line. One of such edifices, which was unearthed in 2018, covered an area of 8 by 4 m (26 by 13 ft), and had three rooms and two furnaces. The evidence points to the fact that it was burned after it was abandoned which was a custom among the Vinčans. They were burning their houses whether to build another one on its place, to move on another location or simply to clear the space. However, several other theories have been suggested. They include the ritual burning, an accidental, local fire or an enemy attack.

Taking into account the large area of the settlement, the largest surveyed from the Vinča period so far in Serbia, a fact that the houses were built at the same time in the compact rows and how the life was organized, Crkvine is more of a proto-urban town, rather than a village.

=== Houses ===
The houses surveyed in 2008 were built in the typical Vinča pattern. In the shallow and narrow foundation trenches, the wooden stakes were driven inside. The stakes had 10 to 20 cm (3.9 to 7.9 in) in diameter and were placed 20 to 50 cm (7.9 to 19.7 in) apart. They were then covered with the interwoven wattle and thin branches creating the skeleton of the house which was then covered with the mixture of clay, earth and chaff. The roofs were most likely a gable ones. The floors were made from the wooden rolls which were covered with the similar mixture as the walls. Sometimes the fragmented pottery was added to the floor mix.

The houses mostly had only one room, but some had up to three. They had some kind of furniture and everyday, clay-made "apparatuses" of the day. They included the five-legged tables, small vessels for keeping the grains, pithoi and large mortars and pestles. In some of the houses the light wooden shelves, which fell off the walls, were discovered. The houses had furnaces and fireplaces, which were the central points of the household life. By 2014, two houses were fully explored. Each had two rooms, ovens for food preparation and heating, storage sections and, beside previously listed objects, had an altar, grinding stones, cooking dishes and bucraniums, the ox-shaped architectural ornaments made from unbaked earth.

House 1/2010

The excavation of the House 1/2010 in 2010, however, showed a different type of architecture. Because of the preserved, identical plank impressions, either in collapsed walls or in situ, and the absence of daub fragments with wattle impressions, it was concluded that the house was built differently. Apparently, it was constructed of massive planks which were then covered with daub. This is atypical construction method for the Vinča period. The wall planks were massive and heavy and wood of such dimensions was never previously recorded in the Vinčan construction. Along with some other findings, this pointed to the massive roof as these walls are capable of bearing heavier loads than the plain wattle and daub walls. A group of holes on regular distance in the floor is identical to the feature found in Parța, Romania where they were explained as the holes for the sides of a ladder. This, and some other discoveries in Crkvine, tentatively point to the existence of upper floors in the houses, which the thicker plank walls could support. Some other houses from the Vinča period on other localities are known to have had upper floors, like Uivar, Parța and Opovo.

A naturally occurred crack split the remains of the house some time ago, which allowed for the archaeologists to check the construction of the floor in detail. The land for the future house was first scorched which formed a thin layer of reddish earth. The scorched ground was covered with the layer of yellow clay which was then stamped down. The yellow clay was then covered with the daub fragments which were reclaimed from some older, previously burned house. All of this was then covered with a clay coating. Some parts of the floor show two layers of clay. This also differs from the usual method of the day and shows the rationality and economizing of the inhabitants. It saved them time and resources as they didn't have to retrieve woods to make rolls and in the long-term heating of the house was easier.

However, some objects within the house were not built on the floor. First, the oven was constructed directly onto the stamped clay layer. Then, the storage container had a foundation made of clay coated pottery fragments. And the pithos was "buried" into the ground, below the floor level. The oven itself was quite large, 2.38 to 1.8 m (7 ft 10 in to 5 ft 11 in), with evident signs of several renovations, and is the largest oven found in the Late Vinča period in Serbia. The house has another, smaller oven.

After the exploration of the house was finished, the remains were covered with geotextile fabric while all the elements above the floor level were furthermore protected with the sandbags. Then, the entire house was covered with the layer of sand, 10 cm (3.9 in) thick, on top of which the protective plastic net was spread. Finally, everything was covered with earth again. The conservation was done to preserve the locality until the proposed idea of making Crkvine a museum in the open is executed.

=== Public spaces ===
The public space areas, proto-squares, show a pattern of planning during the construction of the settlement. There are 10 of such "squares" and each is surrounded by 8 to 12 houses. The largest open space is 50 m × 24 m (164 ft × 79 ft), covering an area of 1,200 m^{2} (13,000 sq ft). The alleys between the houses were narrow, 1.5 to 3 m (4 ft 11 in to 9 ft 10 in). The houses had no yards, so apparently all the communal work had to be done on the "squares". Even by today standards, the structural plan of the settlement is considered good and rational. Compactly built houses in the central part are all in the same direction, while only in the outer sections, on the downhill sloped towards the trenches and creeks, the houses become scattered and differently oriented. The houses are built in parallel, proper 16 rows and grouped in the numbers of 5 to 12. The longer side of one house always faces the longer side of another house. It is believed that each cluster of houses around the "square" was inhabited by the members of one extended family and that settlement sprawled from those clusters.

=== Trenches ===
It is believed that the trenches were foundations for the protective, gated palisades. There are two rows of the trenches on the north side of the settlement, and one on the south. As they follow the routes of the creeks enhancing the natural protective features of the landscape, apart from protection from the wild animals, they probably served as a protection against some, to modern historiography yet unknown enemy. The widest sprawl of the settlement between two trenches, discovered so far, was 265 m (869 ft).

The remains of the trenches, being further from the houses when the settlement was burned, are damaged by fire to the lesser extent. No remains outside of the ditches have been found. However, the mapping shows existence of another double ditch which was buried under the central section of the settlement. It was probably built during the original settling and as the settlement grew and expanded, it was covered up and the houses were built on top of it.

Existence of defensive trenches around the settlements was considered a rarity in the Vinča period. However, recent use of modern mapping and surveying technics showed that many settlements from this period had such trenches: Vinča itself, Uivar, Belovode, Đurića Vinogradi-Grabovac, etc.

== Artifacts ==
=== Figurines ===
Extent of the Vinča culture

As of 2018, some 60 figurines were found. Of those, 43 are completely different from the figurines usually associated with the Vinča culture, while 42 are almost identical. Other small sculptures clearly represent human figures, but Crkvine figurines are stylized. They are cylindrical, without many marks on them, except the accentuated noses and representation of a miniature tool or a weapon on the shoulder. Out of 43 figurines, for 11 the matching shoulder tools have been found.

They are 2 to 6 cm (0.79 to 2.36 in) high and there are several theories explaining their origin. They may show the members of the household or represent the entire population of the settlement. It has also been suggested that they symbolize the member of the foreign community which moved in the settlement or that, on the social level, it points to the first signs of social stratification. All of them were found in only one house, next to the furnace, and most likely marked the act of abandoning the house.

The figurines are arranged in groups of 3 to 10, and the largest figurine in the group is always in the center. Except for these central specimen, the surfaces of the figurines were not additionally treated or coated. They were made from the rather poorly refined, locally obtained clay with no significant mixtures added. In contrast to the majority of other clay objects, neither the ground stone nor pulverized pottery was added to the clay. It appears as if they were produced carelessly, in great haste. The evidence of carelessness in obvious on the surface of the figurines, and experimental reproduction showed that one figurine could be produced in 5 moves for 60 to 90 seconds. The central, larger figurines are somewhat more meticulously produced. They have a spherically modeled heads and the round shoulders are properly sculptured. Their body resembles the typical shape of Vinča figurines and the front seems to represent some kind of stylish dress. The surface is coated with slip and much more carefully crafted.

The miniature tools (or weapons), which were placed over the right shoulder where the hole is modeled on the figurines, were made with much more attention. Of those preserved, on closer inspection, it is believed that they represent various tools: hammer axes (in the Pločnik style), pick axes, one has an elongated blade while some are spherical and may represent mallets or scepters. It is estimated that the figurines were assembled in groups just hours prior to the settlement being set on fire. This, with the hastiness in their production, leans towards the theory that the assemblages were ritual, that settlement was attacked by foreign population and that threat was imminent for some time before the fire engulfed the settlement. This obscures the knowledge of whether such arrangement was a regular occurrence, or was some ritual in the case of great need or emergency. Though Crkvine is unique in this matter, the arrangement of the figurines is somewhat similar to the one discovered in Divostin.

It appears that the symbolism of the figure-tool object lays within the tools. While the figure is rather reduced and without detail, the tools are so meticulously done that they can clearly be identified as they are almost exact copies of the real objects. This also may point to the fully fledged division of labor and the development of vertical stratification in the society.

Due to their appearance, the figurines were jokingly compared to the La Linea animated character or nicknamed the "clay army".

=== Tools ===
As only a small part of Crkvine was physically explored so far, the results concerning the tools are still considered preliminary. The stone tools were found in two stratigraphic units, fitting the final phase of the Vinča culture. In general, the tools don't show any major local specificities which would distinguish them from the other late Vinčan tools, or late Neolithic in general. They are almost a textbook examples of what the tool producing looked like in the final Vinčan phase.

Distribution of the discovered tools, so as the presence of abrasive stone (grindstones, whetstones, pounders, quern-stones) and light white stone flakes, shows that the tools were carved in the houses. Ground-edge tools are rare in general, mostly in the form of adze and extremely rare examples of chisel. Frugality of the used stone resources and prominent use of the damaged tools points to the difficulties in obtaining the stone supplies as the sources became inaccessible. The reasons may include the diminished areal of the Vinča culture in its final phase, but also the growing use of metal tools.

More than half of the findings are the un-retouched flakes and blades, while the retouched ones are of an average quality for the period. There is no evidence of unusual or unknown technology. There are some artifacts made of white or grayish-green chert. The material most probably came from the same source which was used by the population which inhabited the locality Kamenite Njive in Barajevo, also on Belgrade territory, and Šalitrena Cave in the village of Brežđe, near Valjevo.

Based on the found tools, the inhabitants probably mined stones from some quarries, but also used the materials from the greywacke deposits and the alluvium deposits. The raw materials were most likely exploited from the narrow, local area. Abundance of the "light white stone" artifacts doesn't match the materials used in other surrounding localities at the time: in Vinča itself they used magnesite, diatomite in Ilića Brdo, tuff in another locality of the same name Crkvine, near Mali Borak, etc. It appears that each settlement exploited the materials available in their immediate vicinity.

Though no metal was registered in Crkvine, it is assumed that by this time the inhabitants must have been acquainted with the existence of metal tools and that they used them, as represented by the small axes on the figurines' shoulders. Even in the Early Neolithic settlements, the ephemeral usage of small metal tools was recorded. If the settlers at Crkvine used the stone tools only as the cheaper, out-of-date replacements for the modern metal tools, it may explain the findings of the good quality grinding tools (probably used in the mechanical treatment of metal tools) but a careless attitude towards the stone tools (most of which were un-retouched, un-grounded and half-finished, and worn out, and many pebbles and chips had been left the dump site, etc.).

=== Other ===
Almost 50,000 whole or fragmented artifacts were found so far in Crkvine. They are made of baked clay, bones, horns and rocks.

Numerous quartzite, chert and jasper pebbles were also found. They could not be associated with the stone tools, as there is no evidence which points to their usage in this production. Additionally, being small and naturally fractured, they are materials of low quality and not suitable for the tools. As they are all found on one place, it was concluded that it was a sort of a landfill, where the waste materials and by-products of tool and pottery making were deposited. There is a possibility that these rocks were crushed and added to clay in the ceramic production. The pottery found in Crkvine is indeed rich in finely grained quartzite. There are also numerous pottery fragments which can't be reconstructed into any vessels or objects.

== Society ==
Map of Serbia with markers showing the locations of major Vinča archaeological sites within Serbia

The society is considered to be egalitarian. The members probably differentiated by their knowledge, both in general sense or by the specific ritual knowledge. They closely cooperated with other nearby Neolithic settlements: Grabovac, Zvečka, Jasenje (Baljevac) and another Stubline locality, Novo Selo. However, some relics point to trade with distant settlements, up to 500 km (310 mi) away. The volcanic glass obsidian, originating from Hungary and Slovakia has been found, so as the seashells and snails from Greece, bowls from the valley of the Tisza river, etc.

As Crkvine and the surrounding Neolithic settlements were compactly built, with relatively small distances between them and a population which corresponds to the modern number of inhabitants in the existing villages, the dwellers must had a well developed and sophisticated systems of division of resources (pastures, fields, water sources, hunting grounds, fishing zones).

There was, of course, a necessary hierarchy. In the case of Crkvine there are three levels. First hierarchy is on the regional level. In this way, judging by its size, Crkvine probably domineered the surrounding settlements. The second level is on the settlement's rank. There are central houses, which fit in the rules of grouping and aligning around the squares, and there are suburban houses which do not follow that pattern. And there is the third level, concerning the population itself. Indirectly, they figurines point to certain hierarchy as they are always grouped, from 3 to 10, and the largest figurine in the group is always in the center. The latter may also point to the developed religious system of some kind.

The distance between Crkvine and the neighboring settlements was: Jasenje - 8 km (5.0 mi) west; Šarena Česma - 2 km (1.2 mi) northeast; Novo Selo - 4 km (2.5 mi) north; Đurića Vinogradi - 5 km (3.1 mi) northwest. In total, there are 9 sites from the same period within a distance of 15 km (9.3 mi) from Crkvine. The density of population by far surpasses the average estimated density in the Balkans in this period.

Digging of trenches and ditches around the settlement and "urban planning" of the settlement itself shows that some joint, communal effort existed. This could be done only in two ways, as the forced labor or as a collaborative effort as a result of the sense of belonging to the society. Since there is no definite confirmation that the society in the Neolithic was stratified to such an extent that one group could force another group to do work for them, it is suggested that the society in Crkvine was tightly bonded in the family-extended family ties and then by the sense of belonging to the community on settlement level. However, the exact position of Crkvine as kind of a metropolis, compared to the other settlements as outer suburbs (a cell of the territorial organization), cannot be confirmed with certainty. Equally, it is not knowns if there existed some kind of "regional" belonging, despite a fact that 4 closer settlements vanished at the same time as Crkvine, which could mean that Crkvine had a major position in this supra-village society. The surrounding settlements were indeed much smaller in size (2 to 3 ha (4.9 to 7.4 acres)) and the conclusion may be that they gravitated towards Crkvine.

== Economy ==
As the surrounding terrain is fertile, arable land, the main branch of economy was agriculture. including husbandry. The Dren Elevation used to be surrounded by the marshy ponds and water canals, formed by all three rivers, but also by numerous smaller creeks and canals which are today dry, except for a few, like Izvorac, Trstenica and Vukićevica. In the spring, when the waters would retreat, the fertile mud was left, covering the ground, acting like a natural fertilizer and making the plowing easier. The estimated area available to the population of the settlement includes 120 km^{2} (46 sq mi) or meadows and forests on the Dren Elevation, 90 km^{2} (35 sq mi) of arable land and numerous marshes and watercourses.

All rivers and creek are rich in fish, so the fishery was probably also developed. Water springs are abundant in the area. Some of the marshes remained through the hole year, being rich in fish, birds and other animal life. Former local ponds of Velika Bara and Nurča, which survived up to the 1970s, are today merely draining canals. Also, at the time, the area was surrounded by the centennially old oak forests.

== Later developments ==
After the locality was abandoned in c. 4600 BC, the area remained uninhabited for the next 1,200 years, when the Late Chalcolithic settlement developed in 3400 BC. That settlement also disappeared and the next human presence was recorded 4 millennia later. There are very few remains from the Late Chalcolithic period. After the collapse of Neolithic Crkvine, such large, architecturally planned and densely populated settlements did not develop in this area until the period of the Roman Empire.

A burial site from the late 8th century was discovered in the vicinity of the locality. It was a young male, some 15 years old, who was buried in the usual Avar outfit, including the characteristic belt. There was a wooden bowl next to his feet. It is one of the rare Avar graves south of the Danube and Sava rivers.

The layers dating from the Vinča period were disturbed by the necropolis which existed on the location in the 1600s–1700s. The existence of a cemetery may indirectly confirm that there was indeed a church in this area, though its exact location remains unknown. Also, the centuries of plowing of the terrain above the remains took its toll in damaging the remains.

== Sources ==
Books

- Adam N. Crnobrnja (2009). Неолитско насеље на Црквинама у Стублинама [Neolithic settlement at Crkvine in Stubline] (in Serbian). Belgrade: Belgrade City Museum. ISBN 978-86-80619-53-8.
- Adam Crnobrnja; Zoran Simić; Marko Janković (2011). "Late Vinča culture settlement Crkvine in Stubline". Starinar. Belgrade: Starinar, LIX/2009, DOI: 10.2298/STA0959009C, Serbian Archaeological Society.
- Dragana Antonović, Josip Šarić (23 February 2011). Stone tools from locality Crkvine in Stubline (PDF) (in Serbian and English). Belgrade: Starinar, LXI/2011, DOI: 10.2298/STA1161061A, Serbian Archaeological Society.
- Adam N. Crnobrnja (2011). "Arrangement of Vinča culture figurines - a study of social structure and organization". Documenta Praehistorica. 38. Ljubljana: Documenta Praehistorica XXXVIII: 131. doi:10.4312/dp.38.11.
- Adam N. Crnobrnja (2012). "Group identities in the Central Balkan Late Neolithic". Documenta Praehistorica. 39. Ljubljana: Documenta Praehistorica XXXIX: 155. doi:10.4312/dp.39.11.
- Adam N. Crnobrnja (2012). "Investigations of late Vinča house 1/2010 at Crkvine in Stubline". Starinar (62). Belgrade: Starinar LXII/2012, DOI: 10.2298/STA1262045C, Serbian Archaeological Society: 45.
- Adam N. Crnobrnja (2014). Wolfram Schier & Florin Drașovean (ed.). "The Neolithic and Eneolithic in Southeastern Europe: new approaches to dating and cultural dynamics in the 6th to 4th millennium BC - The (E)neolithic settlement Crkvine at Stubline, Serbia". In: W. Schier and F. Draşovean (Eds.), the Neolithic and Eneolithic in Southeast Europe; New Approaches to Dating and Cultural Dynamics in the 6th to 4Th Millennium Bc (Prähistorischearchäologie in Südosteuropa; Bd. 28), Rahden/Westf.: Leidorf 2014, 173-186. Rahden: Prähistorische Archäologie in Südoseuropa, book 28.

Journals

- Branka Vasiljević (23 September 2018). "Figurine iz neolita proslavile Stubline" [Neolithic figurines made Stubline famous (interview with Miloš Spasić, senior curator of the Belgrade City Museum and head of the Stubline dig)]. Politika (in Serbian).
- Branka Vasiljević (21 September 2018). "Како се чувају неолитске посуде из Стублина" [How the Neolithic vessels from Stubline are being preserved]. Politika (in Serbian). p. 16.
- Saša Rakezić (4 February 2010). "Glinena vojska stara 6.500 godina" [6,500 thousand years old clay army]. Vreme, No. 996 (in Serbian).
- Government of Republic of Serbia (25 September 2014). "Одлука о утврђивању локалитета Црквине у Стублинама за археолошко налазиште" [A decision on declaring the locality Crkvine in Stubline an archaeological site] (in Serbian). Službeni glasnik Republike Srbije, No. 103/14.

Web

- "Archaeological site Crkvine in Stubline, Obrenovac". Cultural properties in Belgrade.
- Milan Nikolić (13 March 2016). "Црквине - позновинчански локалитет" [Crkvine - Late Vinča locality]. Academos.
