= Crkvina =

Crkvina is a Serbo-Croatian placename that may refer to:

- Crkvina (island), a Croatian island in the Adriatic
- Crkvina, Bosanski Šamac, a village in Bosnia and Herzegovina
- Crkvina (Kruševac), a village in Serbia
- Crkvina, Biskupija, an archeological site near Knin, Croatia
- Crkvina, Kakanj, the site of the Zgošća Stećak in central Bosnia
- Crkvina, Neum, a stećak necropolis near Neum, Herzegovina

== See also ==
- Cerkovinë, Albania
- Crkvine (disambiguation)
