= Vinča culture =

Archaeological culture of Southeastern Europe

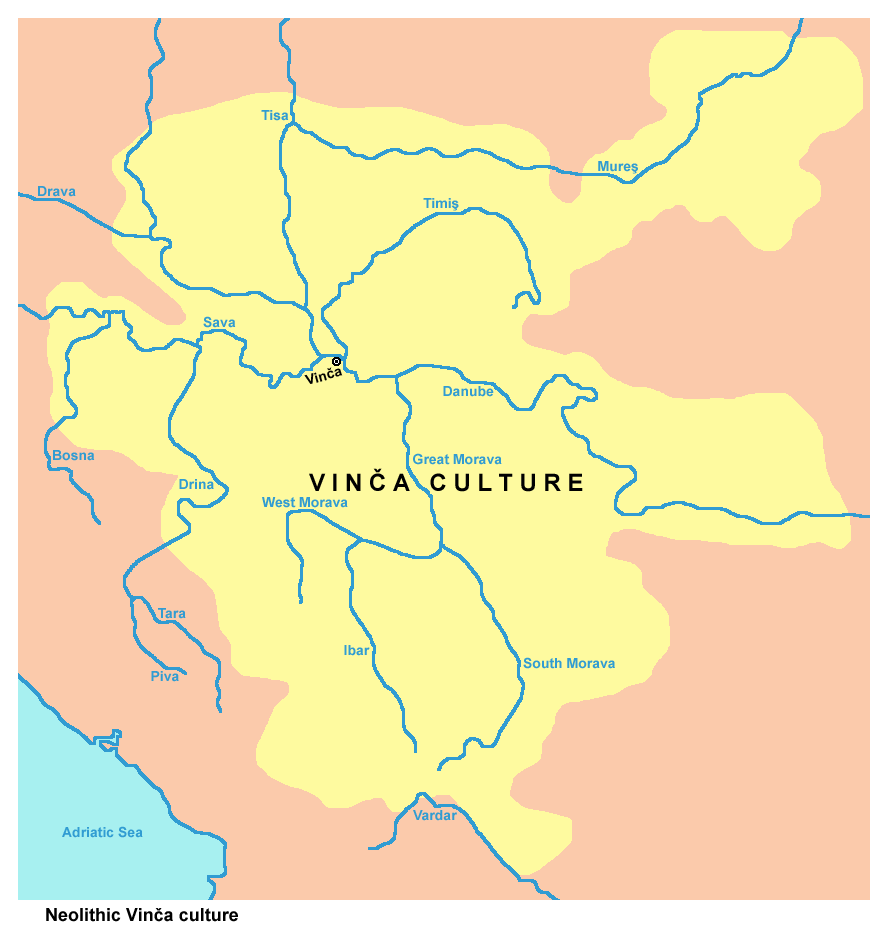
- Map showing the extent of the Vinča culture
- Alternative names: Turdaş culture Tordos culture
- Horizon: First Temperate Neolithic, Old Europe (archaeology)
- Period: Neolithic–Chalcolithic
- Dates: c. 5400–4500 BC
- Type site: Vinča-Belo Brdo
- Major sites: Belogradchik; Drenovac; Fafos; Gomolava; Gornja Tuzla; Pločnik; Rudna Glava; Selevac; Tărtăria; Turdaş; Vratsa; Vršac
- Characteristics: Large tell settlements Anthropomorphic figurines Vinča symbols
- Preceded by: Starčevo culture
- Followed by: Tiszapolgár culture

The Vinča culture [ʋîːnt͜ʃa], also known as Turdaș culture, Turdaș–Vinča culture or Vinča-Turdaș culture, is a Neolithic archaeological culture of Southeast Europe, dated to the period 5400–4500 BC. It is named for its type site, Vinča-Belo Brdo, a large tell settlement discovered by Serbian archaeologist Miloje Vasić in 1908. As with other cultures, it is mainly distinguished by its settlement pattern and ritual behaviour. It was particularly noted for its distinctive dark-burnished pottery.

Farming technology first introduced to the region during the First Temperate Neolithic was developed further by the Vinča culture. This fuelled a population boom that produced some of the largest settlements in prehistoric Europe. These settlements maintained a high degree of cultural uniformity through the long-distance exchange of ritual items, but were probably not politically unified.

Various styles of zoomorphic and anthropomorphic figurines were hallmarks of the culture, as are the Vinča symbols, which some conjecture to be the earliest form of proto-writing. Although the Vinča culture has not been conventionally considered to be part of the Chalcolithic or "Copper Age", it featured the earliest known example of copper smelting.

== Geography and demographics ==
The Vinča culture occupied a region of Southeastern Europe (i.e. the Balkans) corresponding mainly to modern-day Serbia but also parts of Southernmost Hungary, Western-Central Romania (Oltenia, Transylvania), Western Bulgaria, Eastern Croatia, Eastern Bosnia, Northern Montenegro and North Macedonia. John Chapman (1981) previously included Greece and excluded Hungary and Croatia (as new findings and conclusions were not known at the time).

This region had already been settled by farming societies of the First Temperate Neolithic (such as the Starčevo culture) and during the Neolithic demographic transition, population sizes started to grow. During the Vinča period, improvements in technology and changes styles of pottery accelerated. Sustained population growth led to an unprecedented level of settlement size and density. Areas that were bypassed by earlier settlers were also settled. Vinča settlements were considerably larger than almost all other contemporary European culture (with the exception of Cucuteni–Trypillia culture), and in some instances their size surpassed the cities of the Aegean and early Near Eastern Bronze Age a millennium later. Settlement sizes may be grouped into 1-1.9 ha, 4-4.9 ha and 20-29 ha. One of the largest sites was Vinča-Belo Brdo (today a suburb of Belgrade in Serbia), covering 29 hectares (72 acres) with up to 2,500 people.

Early Vinča settlement population density was 50–200 people per hectare, in later phases an average of 50–100 people per hectare was common. The Divostin site was occupied twice between 4900 and 4650 B.C. and an estimate based on 17 houses suggests that given a lifespan per house of 56 years. 1028 houses were built on the site during that period with a final population size estimated to be between 868 and 2864. Another large site was Crkvine-Stubline from 4850/4800 BC. it may have contained a maximum population of 4,000. The settlement of Parţa maybe had 1,575 people living there at the same time. It is considered that alike the Neolithic-Chalcolithic Age "there is no evidence for any proto-urbanism nor specialised military, religious or administrative centres", but their settlements did have defensive formations.

== Origin ==
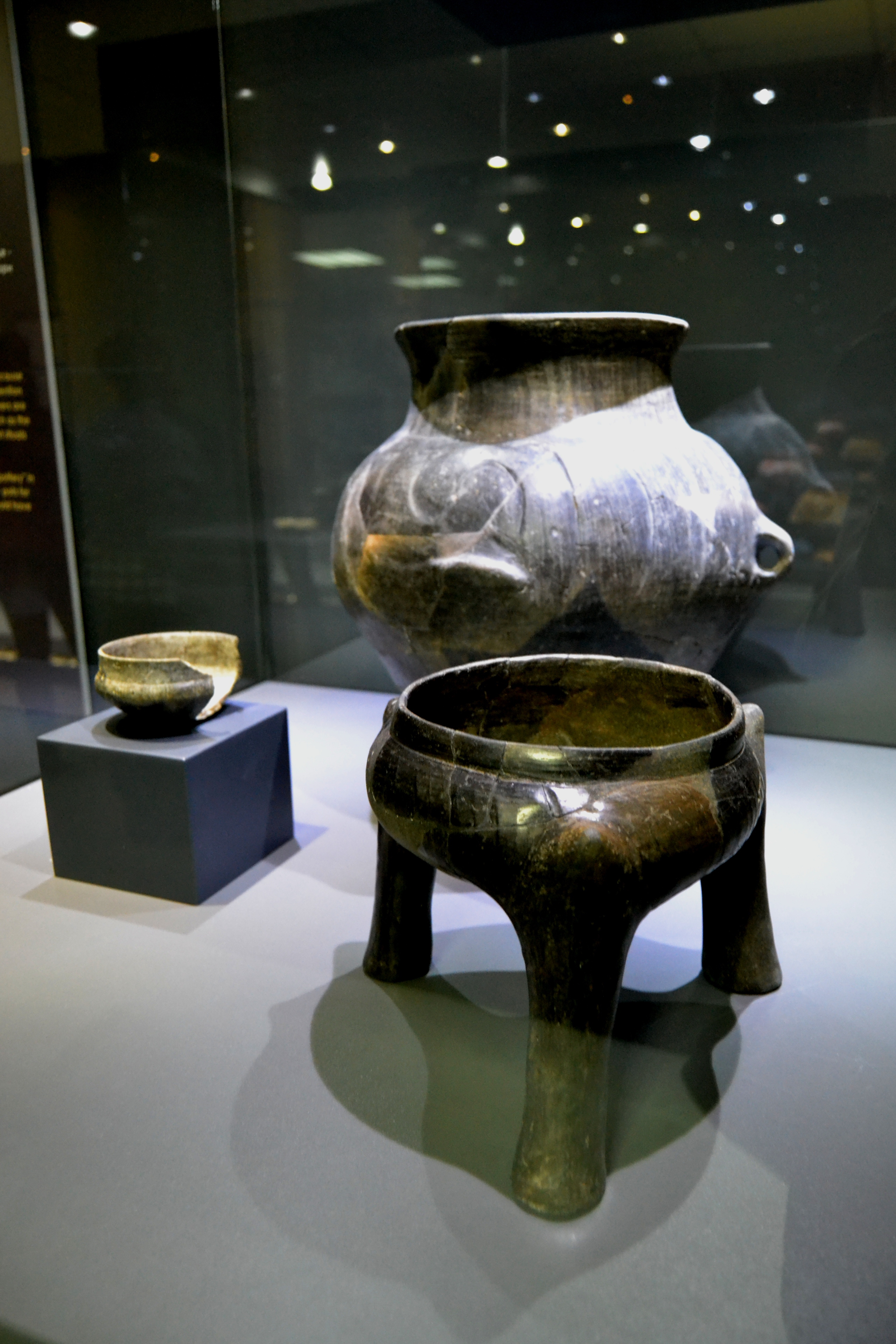
Vinča ceramics

The origins of the Vinča culture are still debated and there exist two mainstream theories, as stated by Marko Porčić (2016), "currently there is no sufficient evidence to accept or to reject out any of the hypotheses proposed for the issue of Vinča culture origins". It is also debatable whether it can be conceptually considered as a "culture" or a "phenomenon".

The first hypothesis is that the Vinča culture developed locally from the preceding Neolithic Starčevo culture—first proposed by Colin Renfrew (1969) and Ruth Tringham (1971)—and it became accepted by many scholars, showing "strong links with the contemporaneous Karanovo (phases III to Kodžadermen-Gumelnita-Karanovo VI) in Bulgaria, Precucuteni-Tripolye A in Moldavia and Ukraine, Dimini in Greece, and the late manifestations of the Starčevo culture and early Sopot culture in eastern Croatia". However, the evidence is not conclusive, and according to recent research "the earliest Vinča sites in the south seem to be as early as those in the north" and have lack of local continuity.

According to the second hypothesis—first proposed by V. Gordon Childe (1929) and Milutin Garašanin (1982)—on the basis of typological similarities, paleodemography and archaeogenetics, the Vinča culture and those of 'Dark Burnished Ware' developed by a second wave population movement from Anatolia to the Balkans after happened demographic-cultural decline and discontinuity between Early-Late Neolithic in the Central Balkans. Recent studies suggest possibility of both local and migration origin, also related to the emergence of Dudești and Boian culture in Romania, or a combination of both origins.

=== Archaeogenetics ===
The 2017 and 2018 archaeogenetic studies on 15 samples show that all except one belonged to the paternal Y-DNA haplogroup G-M201 (G2a2a; G2a2a1; 2x G2a2a1a; G2a2b2a1a-PF3346), while the remaining sample belonged to haplogroup H-P96. Their maternal mtDNA haplogroups belonged to H, H3h2, H26, HV, K1a1, K1a4, K2a, T2b, T2c1, and U2 respectively. According to ADMIXTURE analysis they had approximately 90-97% Early European Farmers, 0-12% Western Hunter-Gatherer and 0-8% Western Steppe Herders-related ancestry, and were closest "to the samples from Neolithic Anatolia and to those of Transdanubia LBK and Starčevo, and from the Early Neolithic period from Germany ... consistent with the presumed direction of Neolithic demic movement from Anatolia through the Balkans to central Europe".

A 2021 study found that Neolithic farmers, including those of the Vinča culture, produced much less cytokine levels for inflammation than earlier hunter-gatherers, which evolutionary introduction to the European genomic heritage helps the immune system of modern Europeans.

== Chronology ==
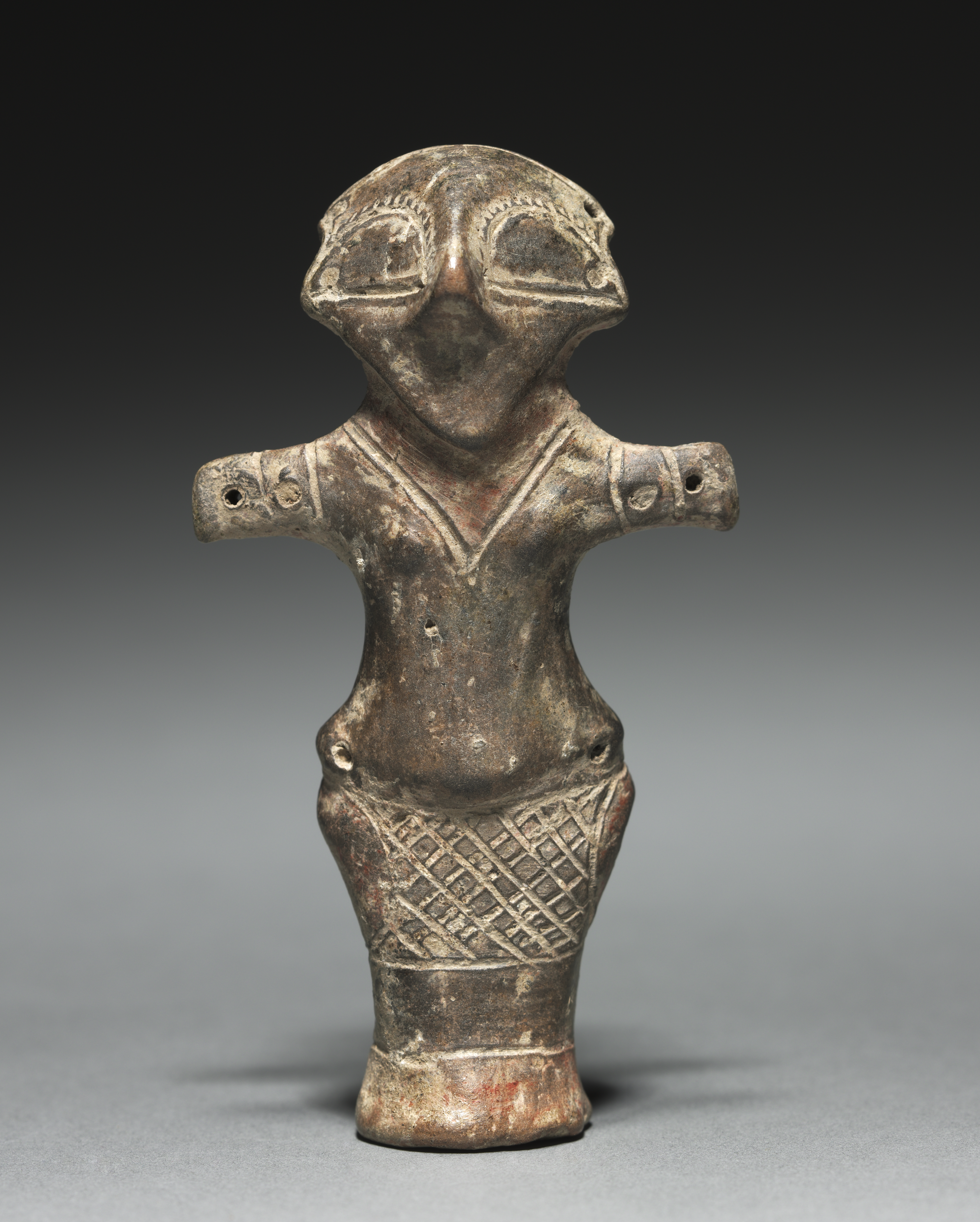
Vinča figurine, Cleveland Museum of Art

There exist several divisions of the culture, according to J. Chapman (1981) it can be divided into two main phases divided into four sub-phases (A-D), closely linked with those of its type site Vinča-Belo Brdo and dated between 5700 and 4200 BC. According to the most recent radiocarbon dating based on 76 dates (1996) Vinča-Belo Brdo spanned between 5200 and 4500 BC; on 155 dates (2009) it was dated between 5400/5300-4650/4600 BC; and on 600 dates (2016) it was concluded that the culture existed between 5400/5300 and 4500 BC.

In the Vinča C phase happened many significant changes to pottery style, settlement and pyrometallurgical activities and increase in ritual figurines among others because of which it is also called as "Vinča C shock" and "Gradac Phase" (Vinča B2-C1). The phenomenon was particularly strong in the South-Moravian and Kosovian variation of the culture.

Vinča culture	Vinča-Belo Brdo	Years BC
Early Vinča period	Vinča A	5400/5300–5200
Early Vinča period	Vinča B	5200–5000/4950
Early Vinča period	Vinča C	5000/4950–4850/4800
Late Vinča period	Vinča D	4850/4800–4600/4500

=== Decline ===
In its late Vinča D phase the centre of the Vinča network shifted from Vinča-Belo Brdo to Vršac, and the long-distance exchange of obsidian and Spondylus artefacts from modern-day Hungary and the Aegean respectively became more important than that of Vinča figurines. Eventually the network lost its cohesion altogether and fell into decline. It is likely that, after two millennia of intensive farming, economic stresses caused by decreasing soil fertility were partly responsible for this decline.

According to Marija Gimbutas, the Vinča culture was part of Old Europe – a relatively homogeneous, peaceful and matrifocal culture that occupied Europe during the Neolithic. According to this hypothesis its period of decline was followed by an invasion of warlike, horse-riding Proto-Indo-European tribes from the Pontic–Caspian steppe. However, this "New Age sentiment" viewpoint was prevalent until 1990s when started to emerge evidences of violent massacres and defensively-enclosed fortified settlements in Neolithic period.

== Economy ==
=== Subsistence ===
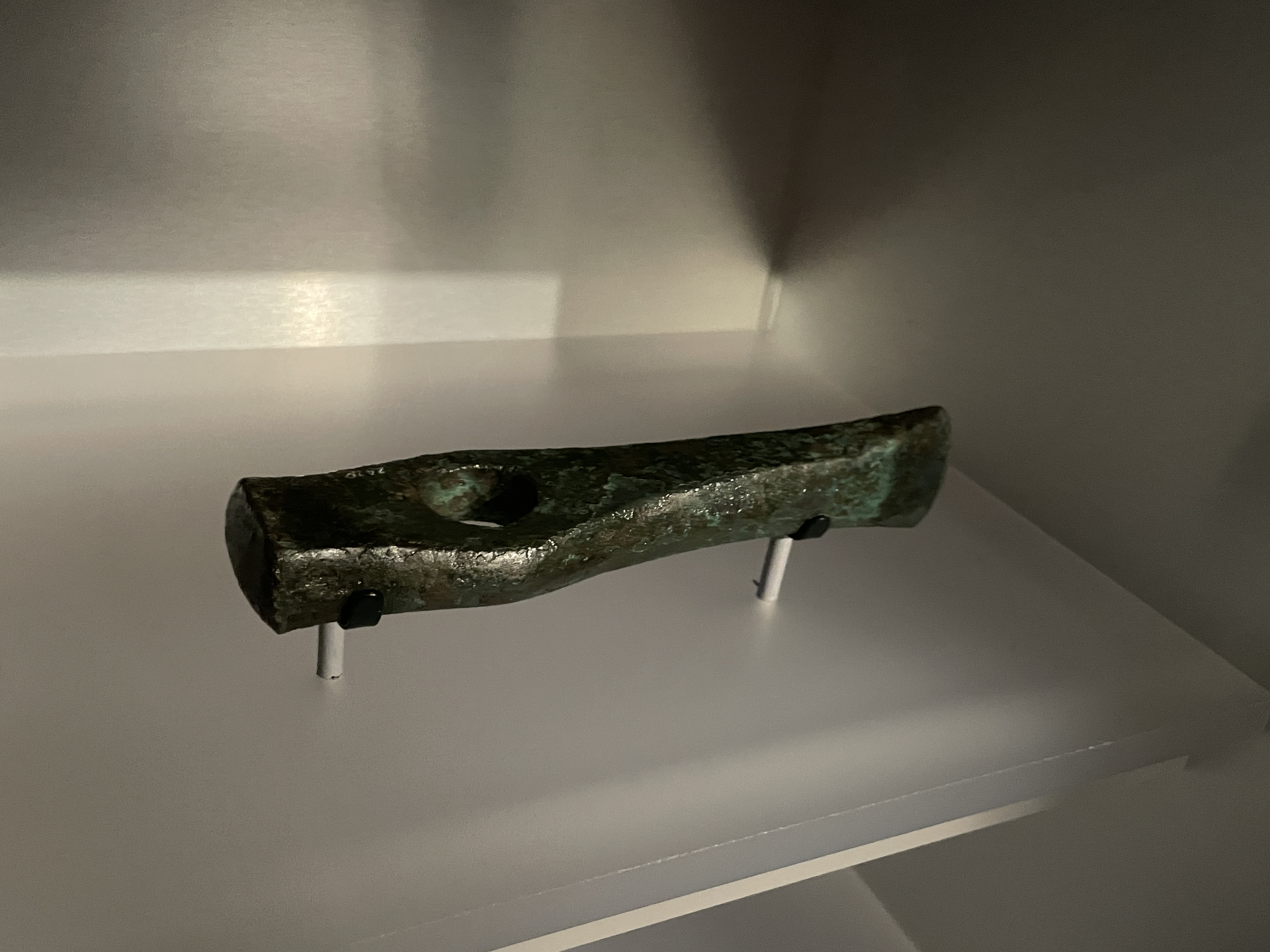
Copper axe from Pločnik, Serbia, c. 5000 BC

Most people in Vinča settlements would have been occupied with the provision of food. They practised a mixed subsistence economy where agriculture, animal husbandry and hunting and foraging all contributed to the diet of the growing Vinča population. Compared to earlier cultures of the First Temperate Neolithic (FTN) these practices were intensified, with increasing specialisation on high-yield cereal crops and the secondary products of domesticated animals, consistent with the increased population density. In the late Vinča period (Vinča D; c. 4850-4500 cal BC) appeared first toggling harpoon.

Vinča agriculture introduced common wheat, oat and flax to temperate Europe, and made greater use of barley than the cultures of the FTN. These innovations increased crop yields and allowed the manufacture of clothes made from plant textiles as well as animal products (i.e. leather and wool). There is indirect evidence that Vinča farmers made use of the cattle-driven plough, which would have had a major effect on the amount of human labour required for agriculture as well as opening up new area of land for farming. Many of the largest Vinča sites occupy regions dominated by soil types that would have required ploughing.

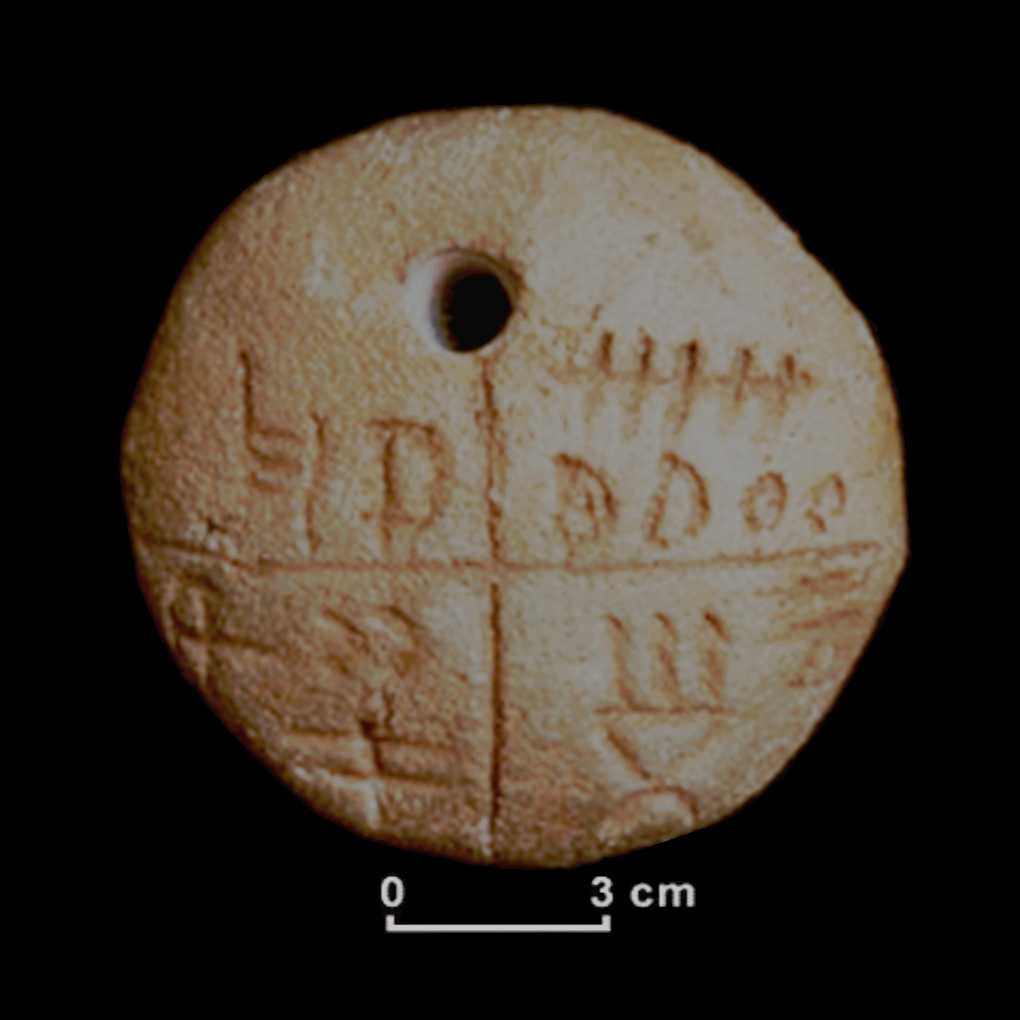
One of the Tărtăria tablets with Vinča symbols, dated to 5500–5300 BC

Areas with less arable potential were exploited through transhumant pastoralism, where groups from the lowland villages moved their livestock to nearby upland areas on a seasonal basis. Cattle were more important than sheep and goats in Vinča herds and, in comparison to the cultures of the FTN, livestock was increasingly kept for milk, leather and as draft animals, rather than solely for meat. Seasonal movement to upland areas was also motivated by the exploitation of stone and mineral resources. Where these were especially rich permanent upland settlements were established, which would have relied more heavily on pastoralism for subsistence.

Although increasingly focused on domesticated plants and animals, the Vinča subsistence economy still made use of wild food resources. The hunting of deer, boar and aurochs, fishing of carp and catfish, shell-collecting, fowling and foraging of wild cereals, forest fruits and nuts made up a significant part of the diet at some Vinča sites. These, however, were in the minority; settlements were invariably located with agricultural rather than wild food potential in mind, and wild resources were usually underexploited unless the area was low in arable productivity.

=== Industry ===
Generally speaking craft production within the Vinča network was carried out at the household level; there is little evidence for individual economic specialisation. Nevertheless, some Vinča artefacts were made with considerable levels of technical skill. A two-stage method was used to produce pottery with a polished, multi-coloured finish, known as 'Black-topped' and 'Rainbow Ware'. Sometimes powdered cinnabar and limonite were applied to the fired clay for decoration. The style of Vinča clothing can be inferred from figurines depicted with open-necked tunics and decorated skirts. Cloth was woven from both flax and wool (with flax becoming more important in the later Vinča period), and buttons made from shell or stone were also used.

The Vinča site of Pločnik has produced the earliest example of copper tools in the world. However, the people of the Vinča network practised only an early and limited form of metallurgy. Copper ores were mined on a large scale at sites like Rudna Glava, but only a fraction were smelted and cast into metal artefacts – and these were ornaments and trinkets rather than functional tools, which continued to be made from chipped stone, bone and antler. It is likely that the primary use of mined ores was in their powdered form, in the production of pottery or as bodily decoration.

== Gallery ==
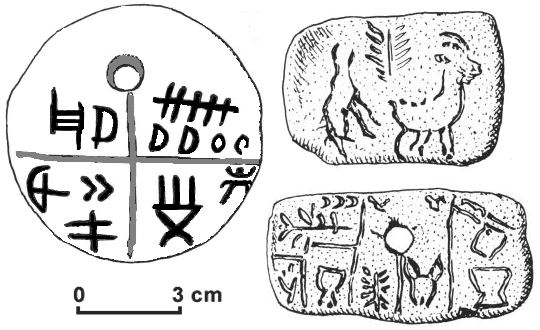
The Tărtăria tablets

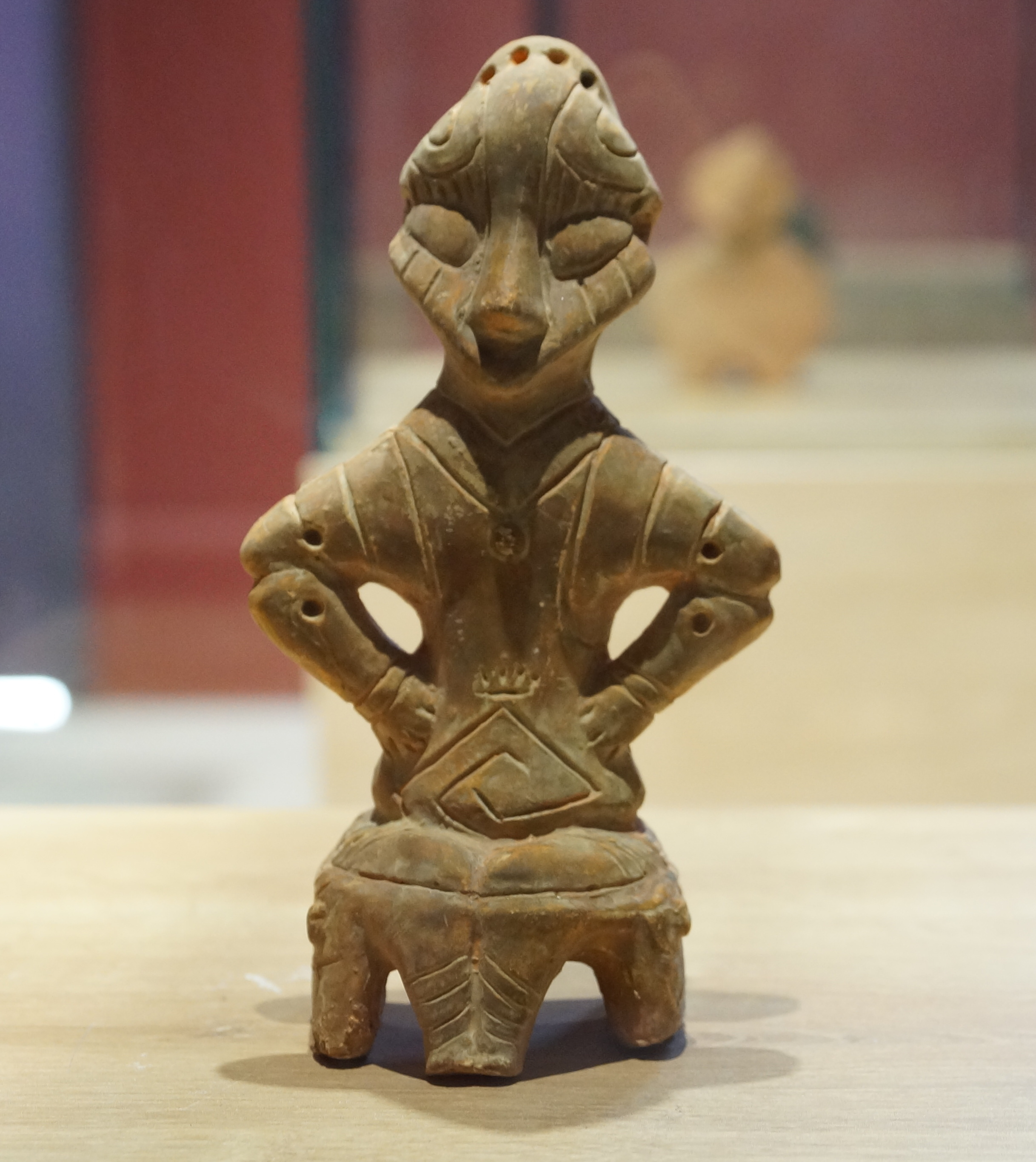
Vinča figurine, the Goddess on the Throne

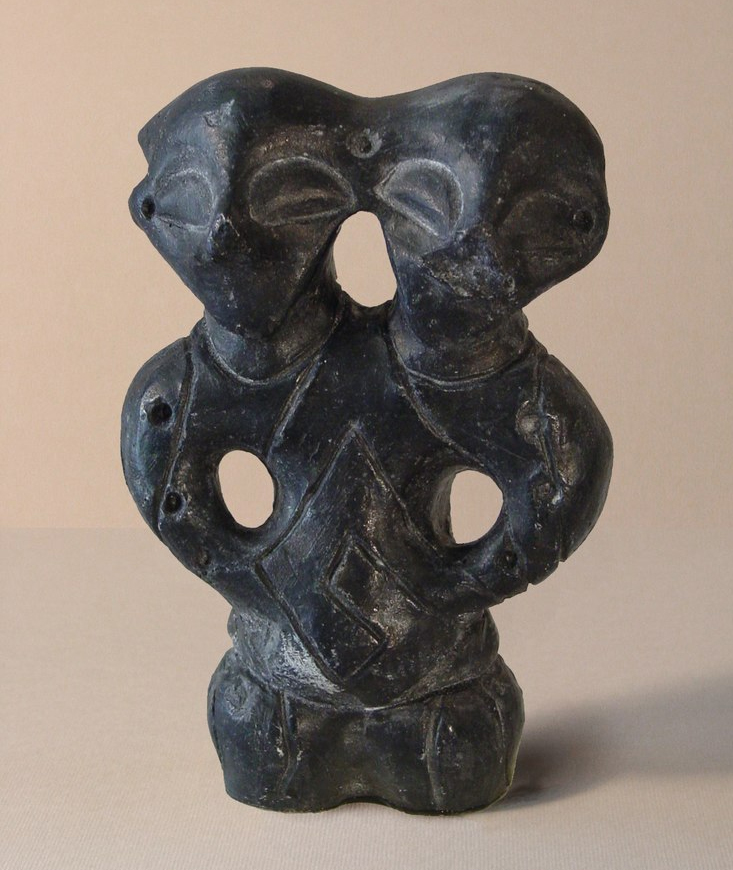
Double-headed figurine

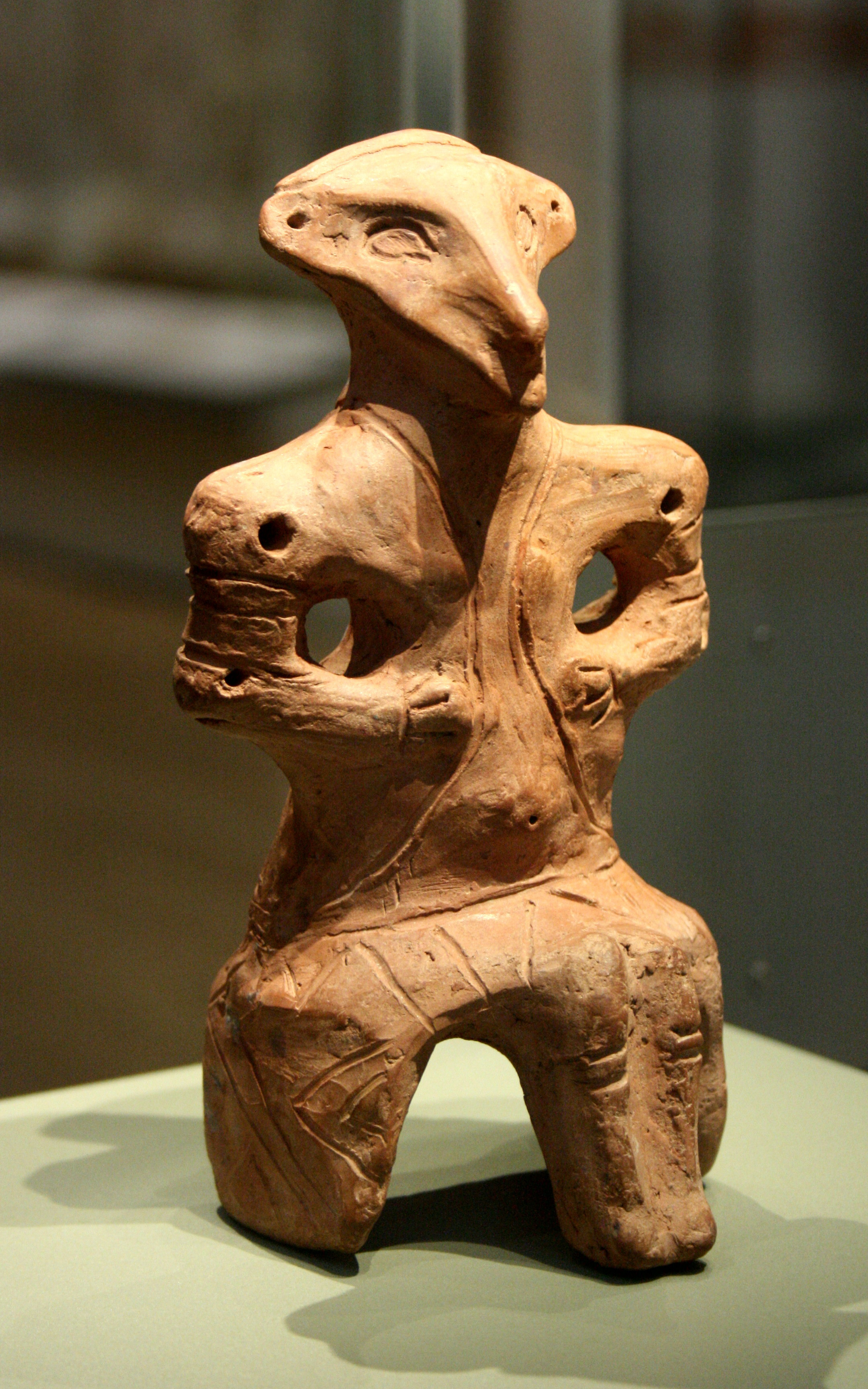
Vinča figurine, British Museum

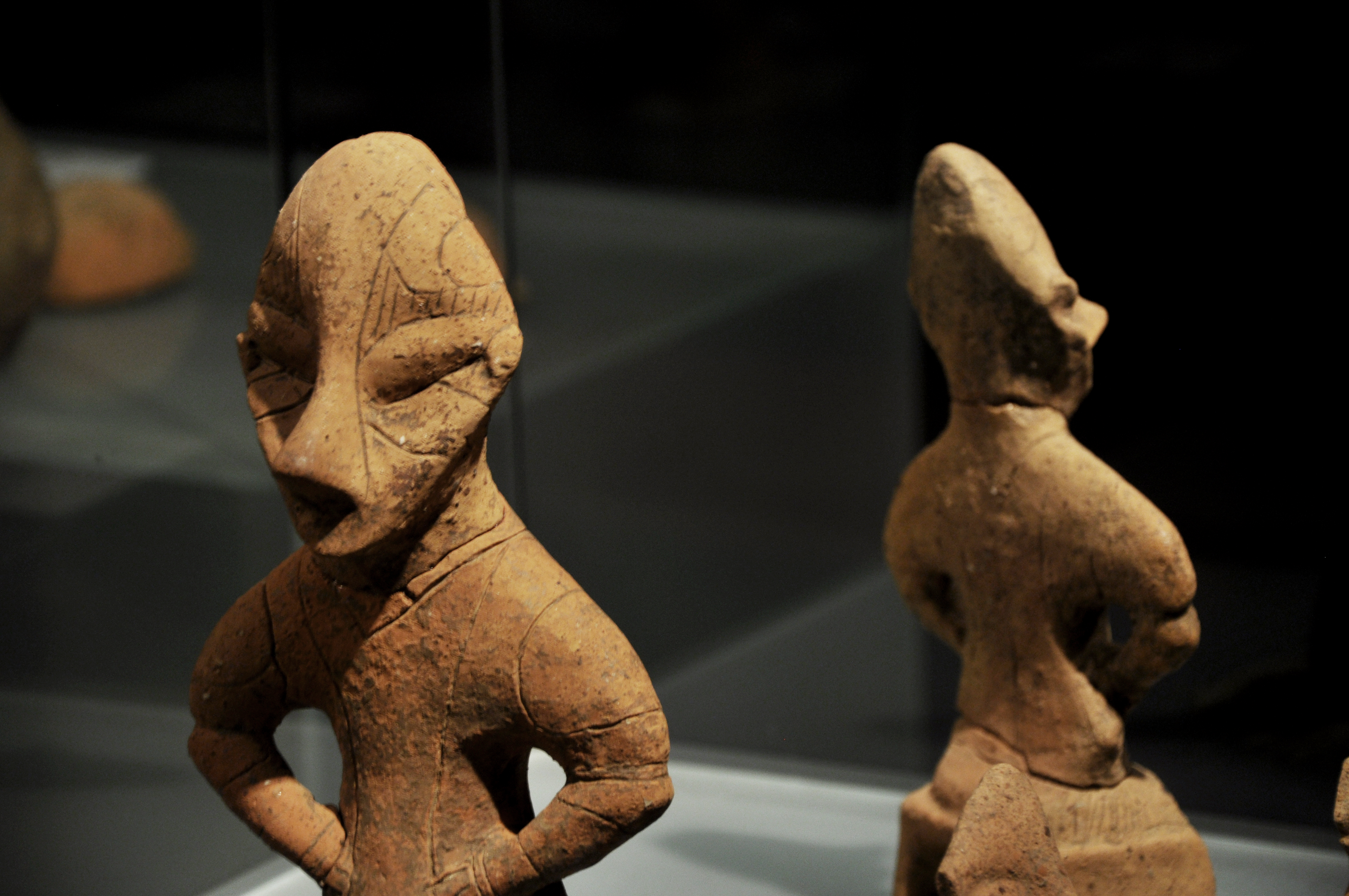
Vinča figurine

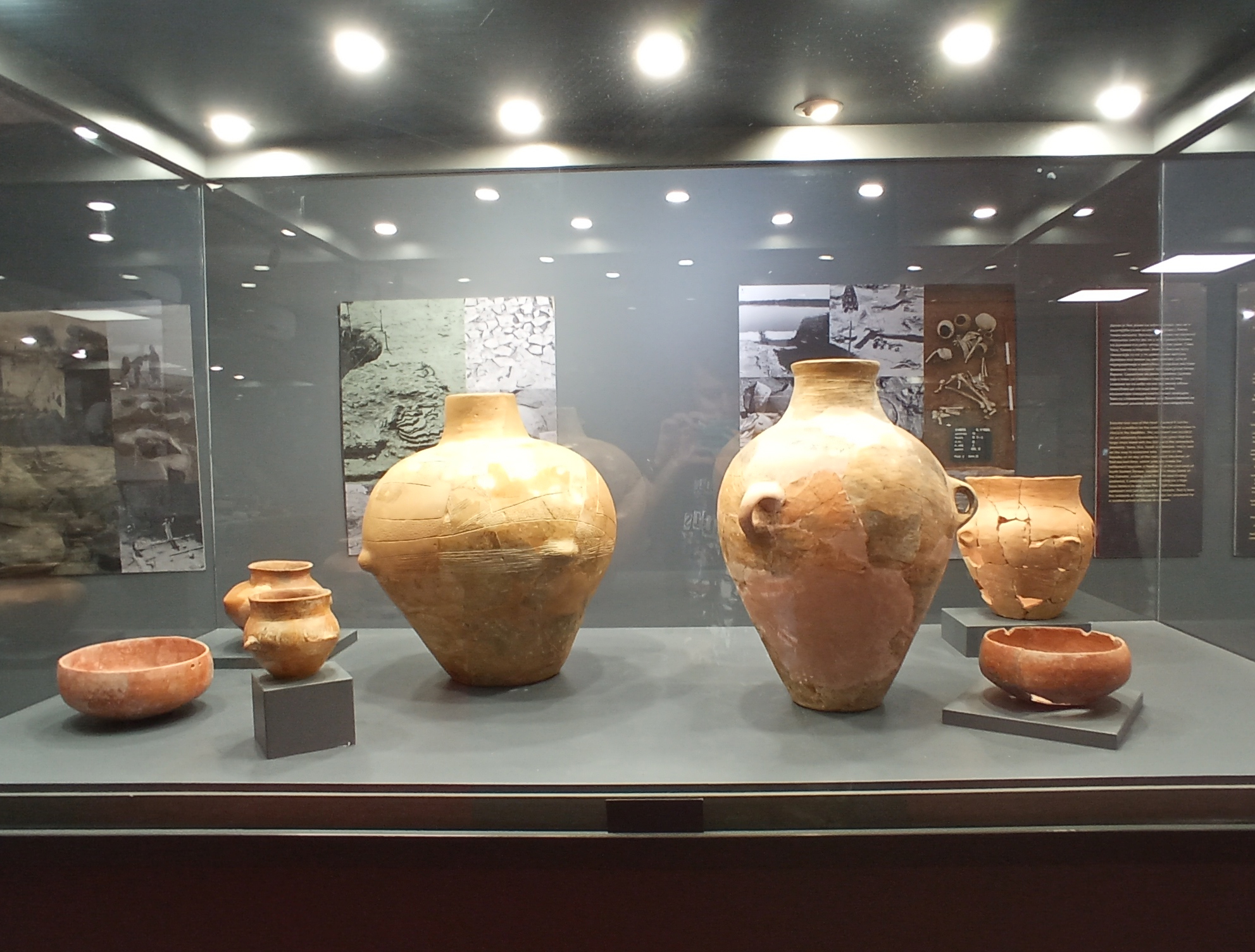
Vinča pottery

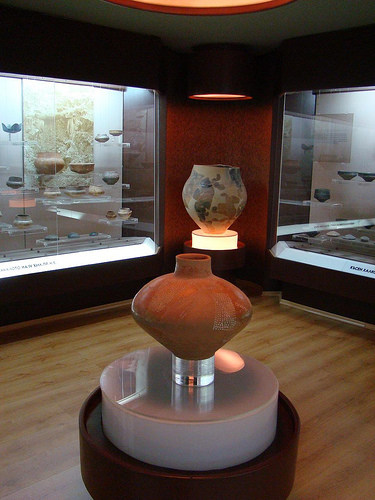
Vinča pottery

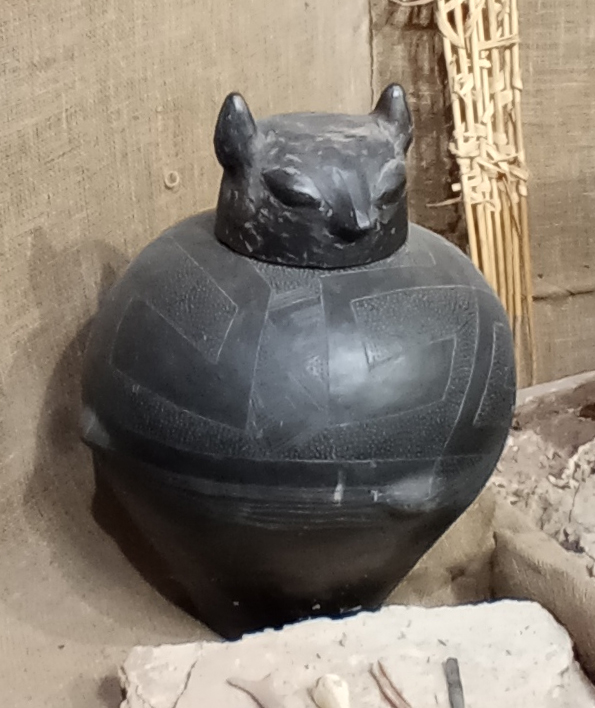
Pottery with sculpted lid (reconstruction)

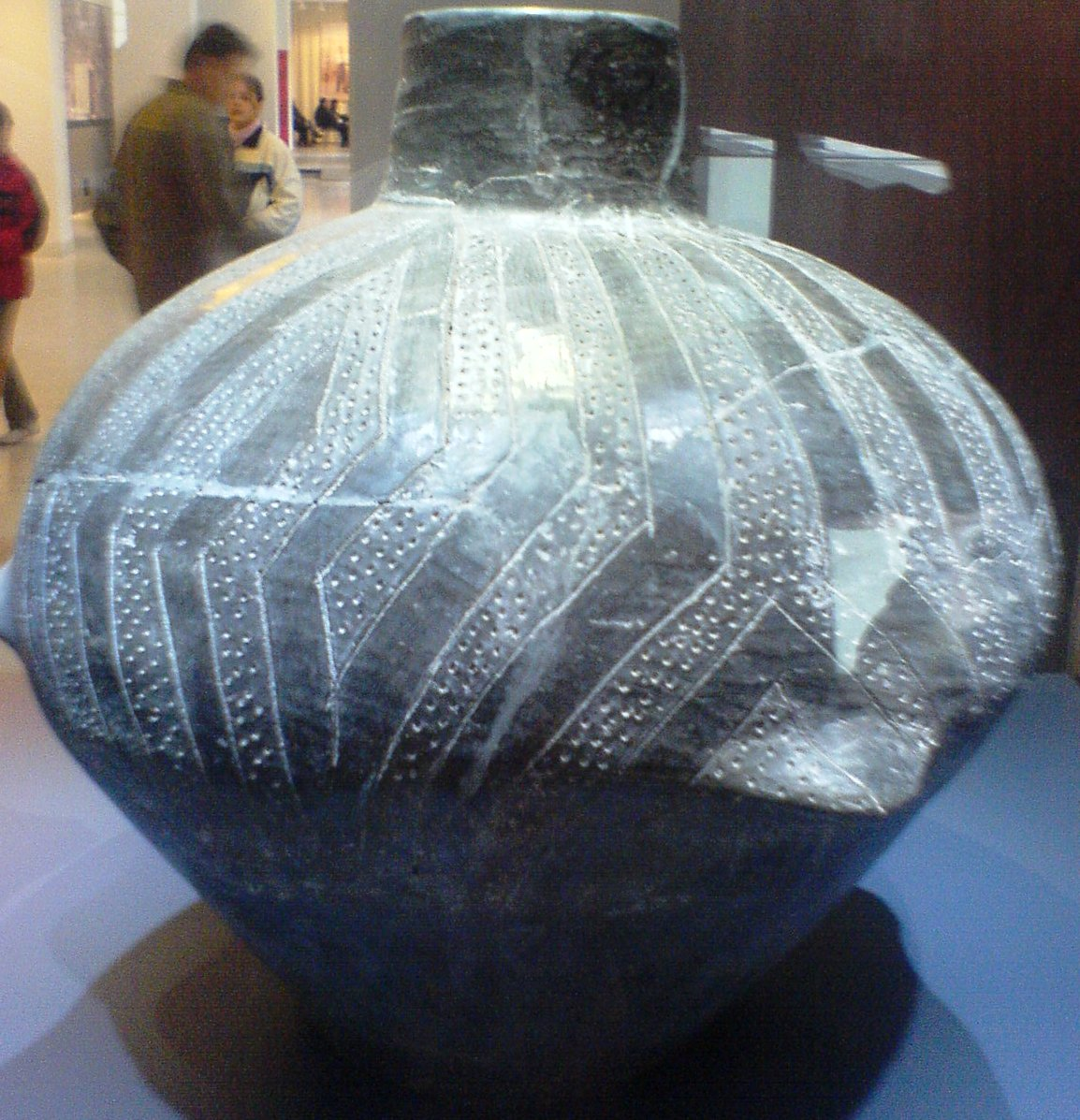

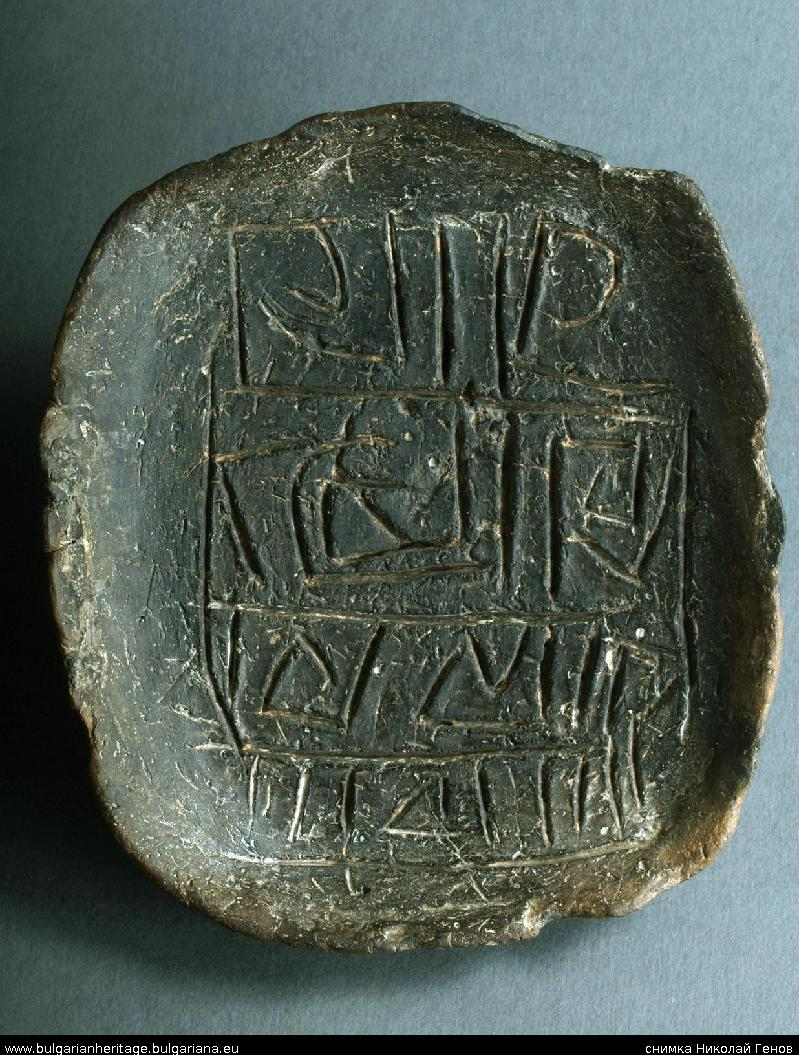

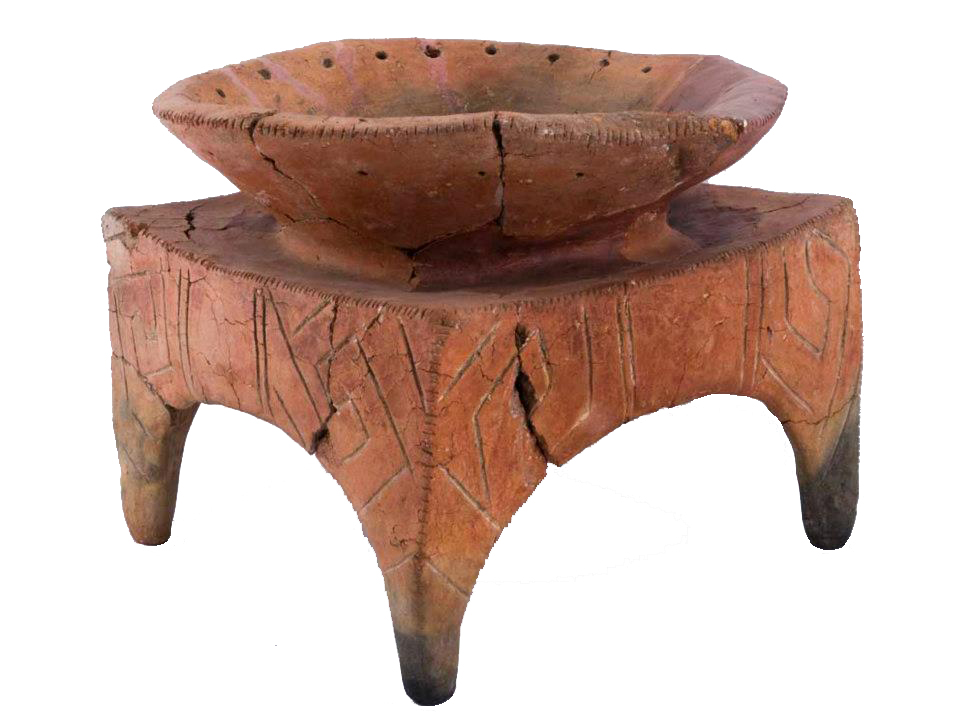

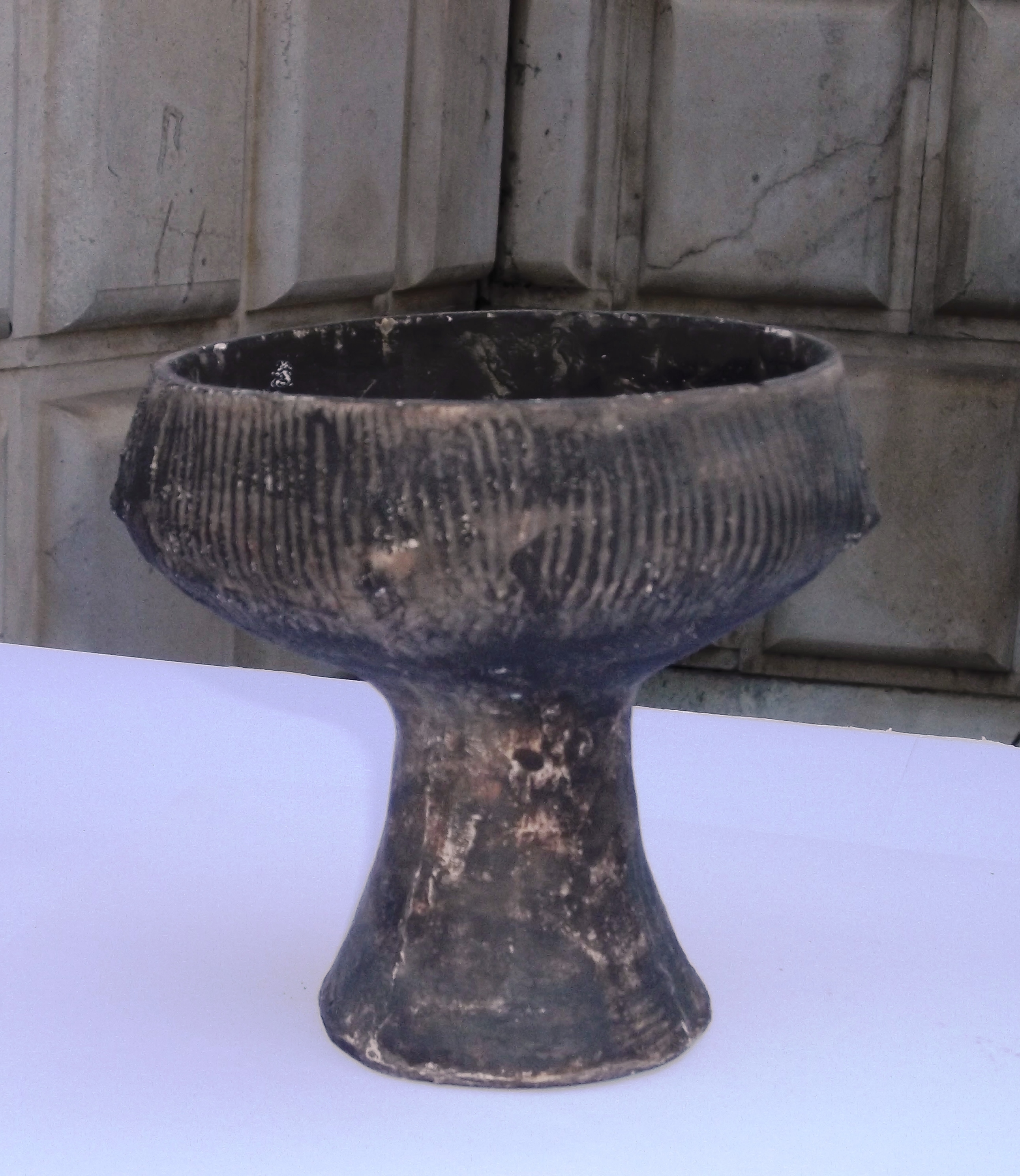
Ceramic vessel

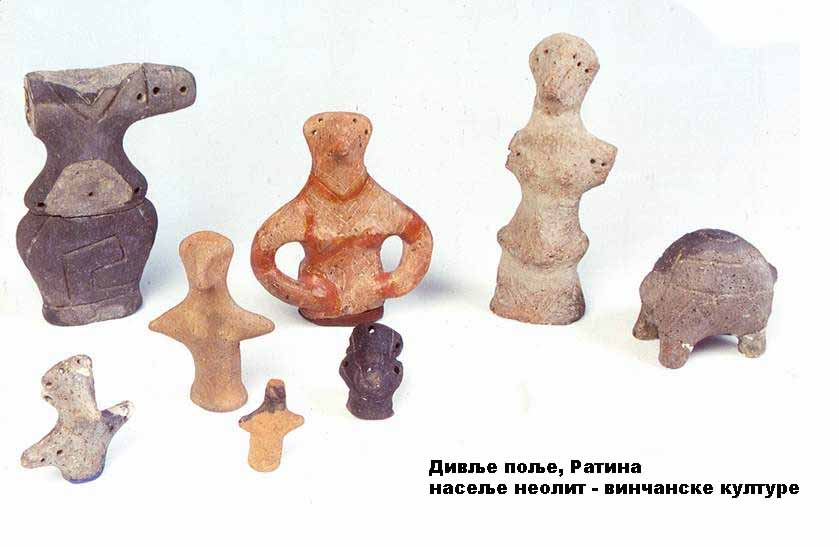

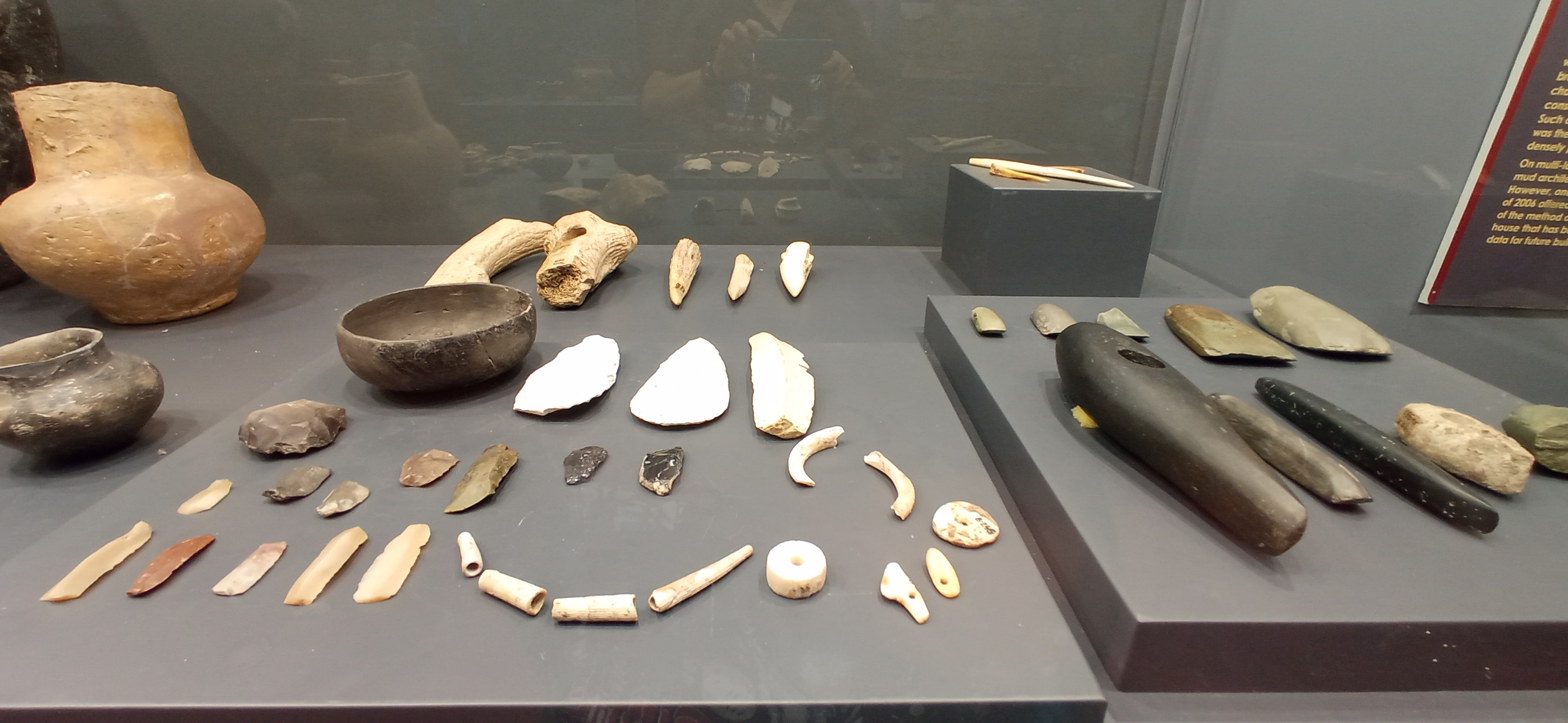

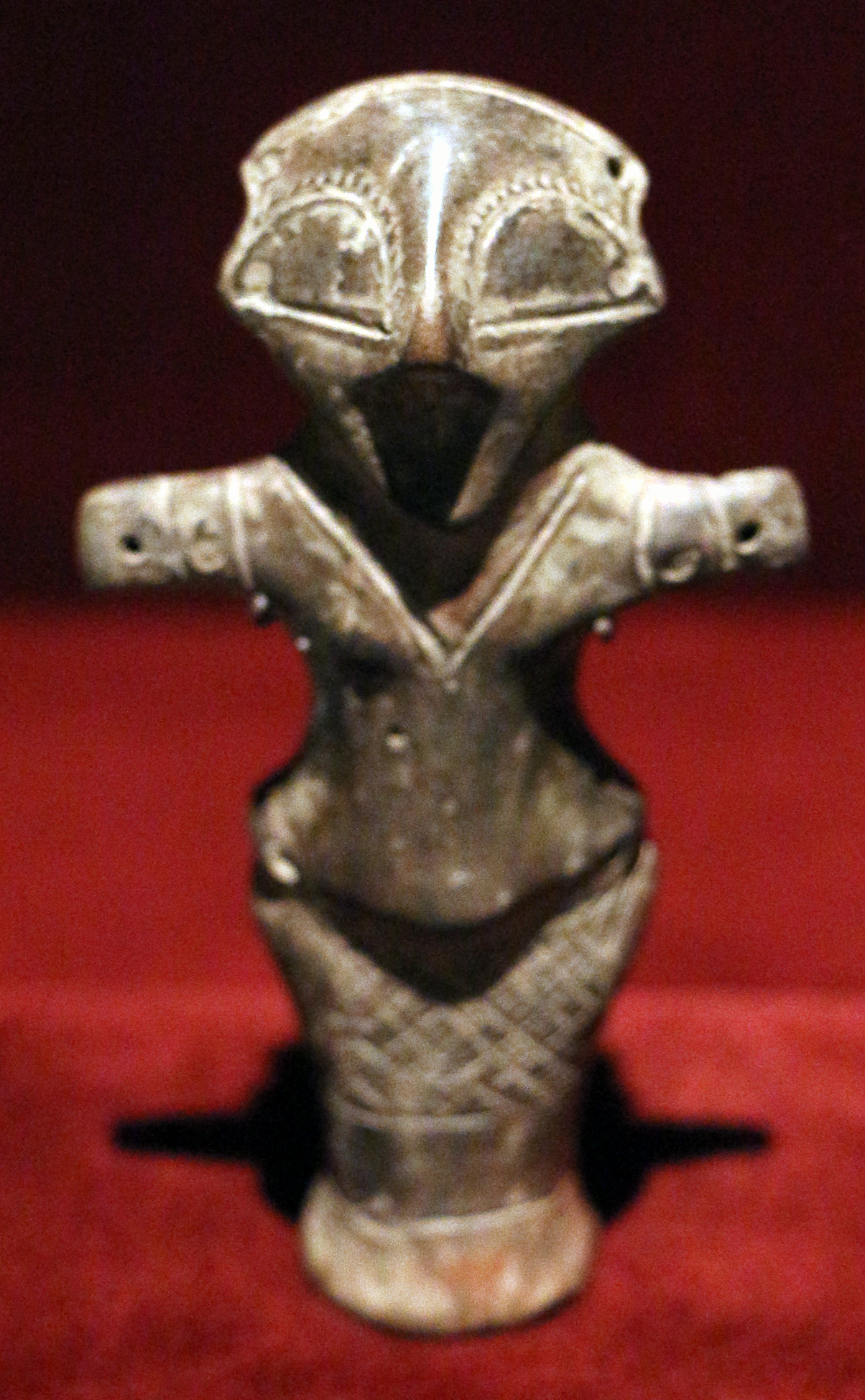

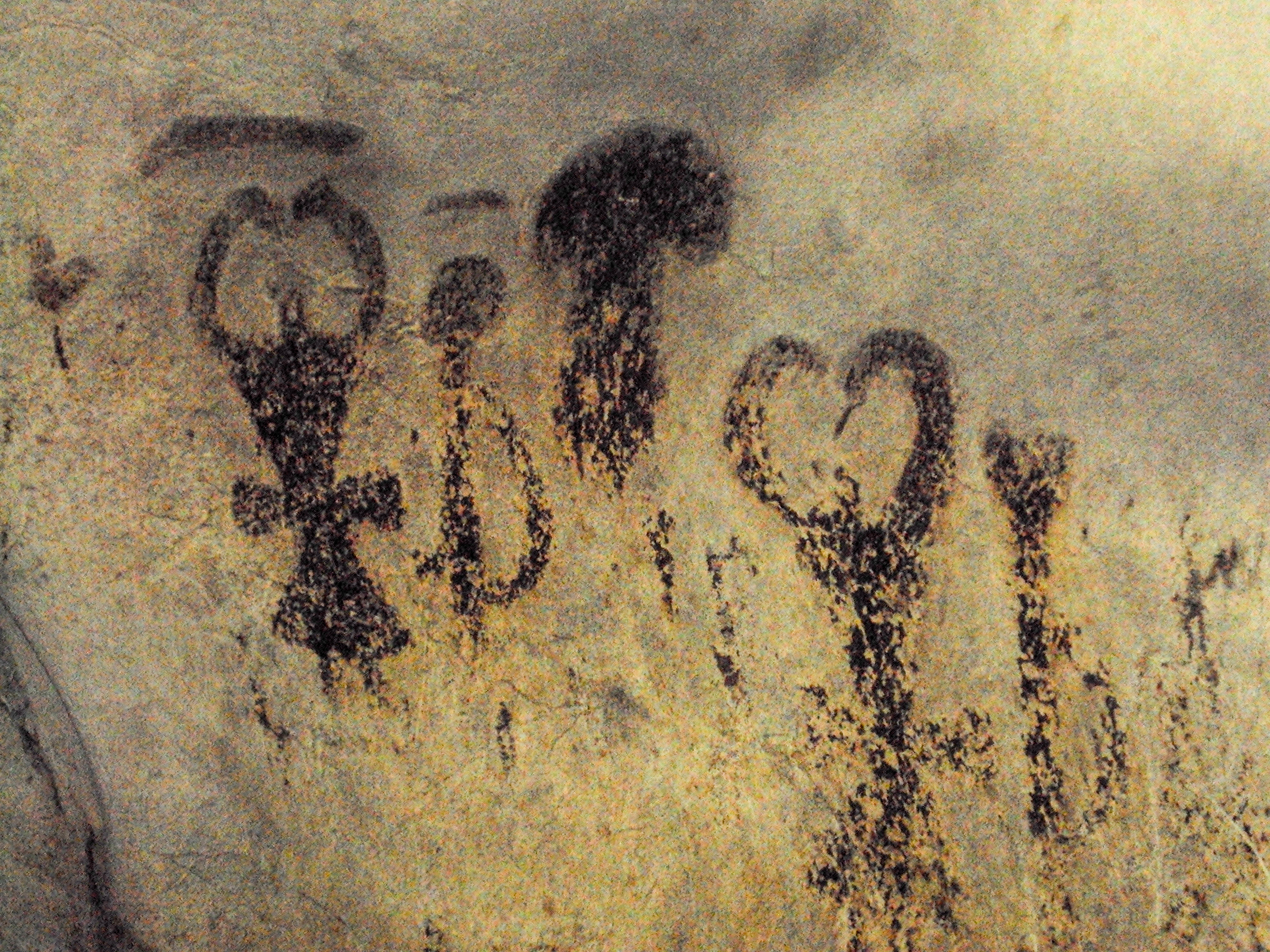
Magura cave drawings

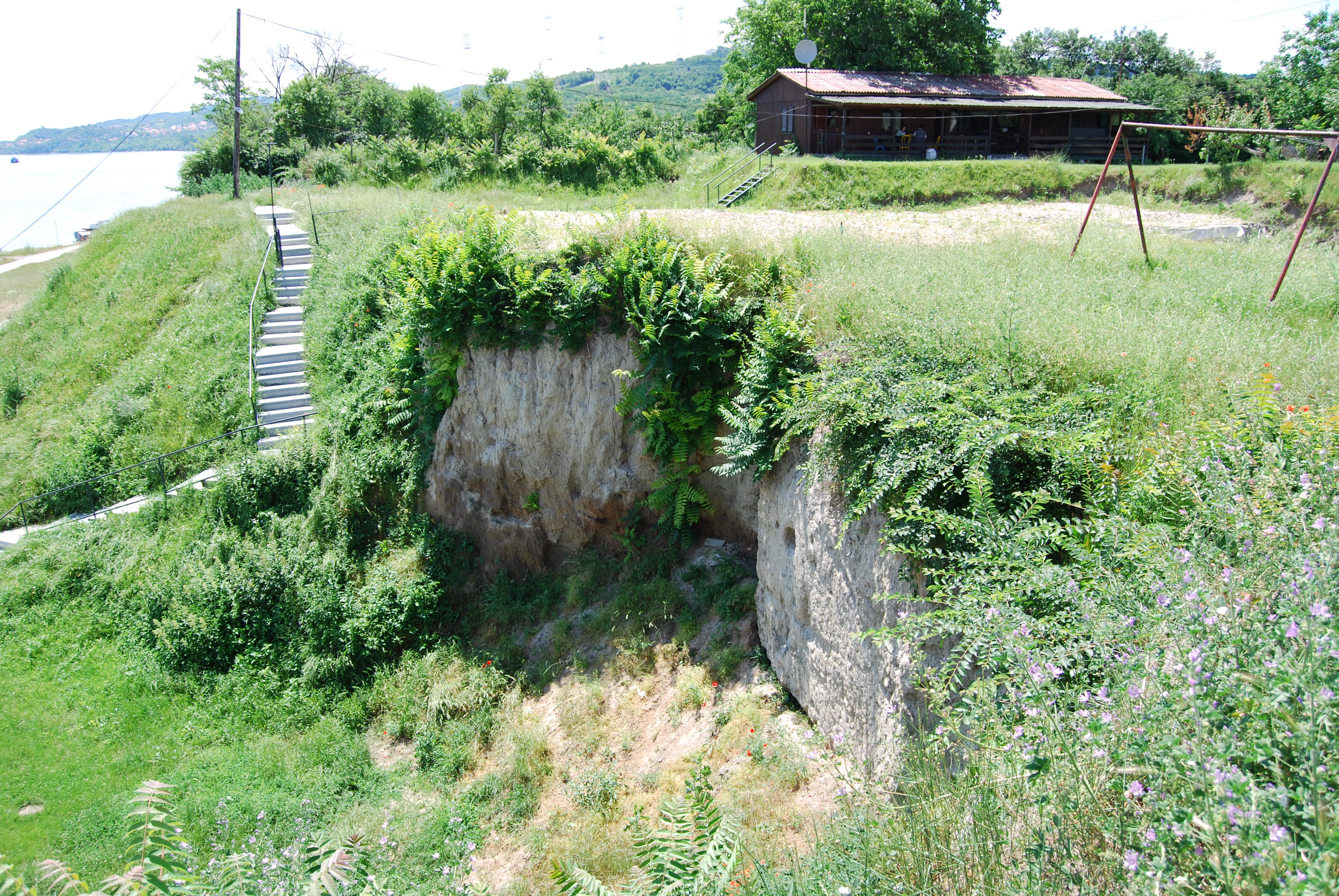
Vinča-Belo Brdo tell site

== Major Vinča sites ==
Map of Serbia and Kosovo with markers showing the locations of major Vinča archaeological sites.
- Belogradchik
- Crkvine
- Drenovac
- Fafos
- Gomolava
- Gornja Tuzla
- Pločnik
- Rudna Glava
- Selevac
- Tărtăria
- Turdaş
- Vinča-Belo Brdo, the type site
- Vratsa
- Vršac

== See also ==
- Hamangia culture
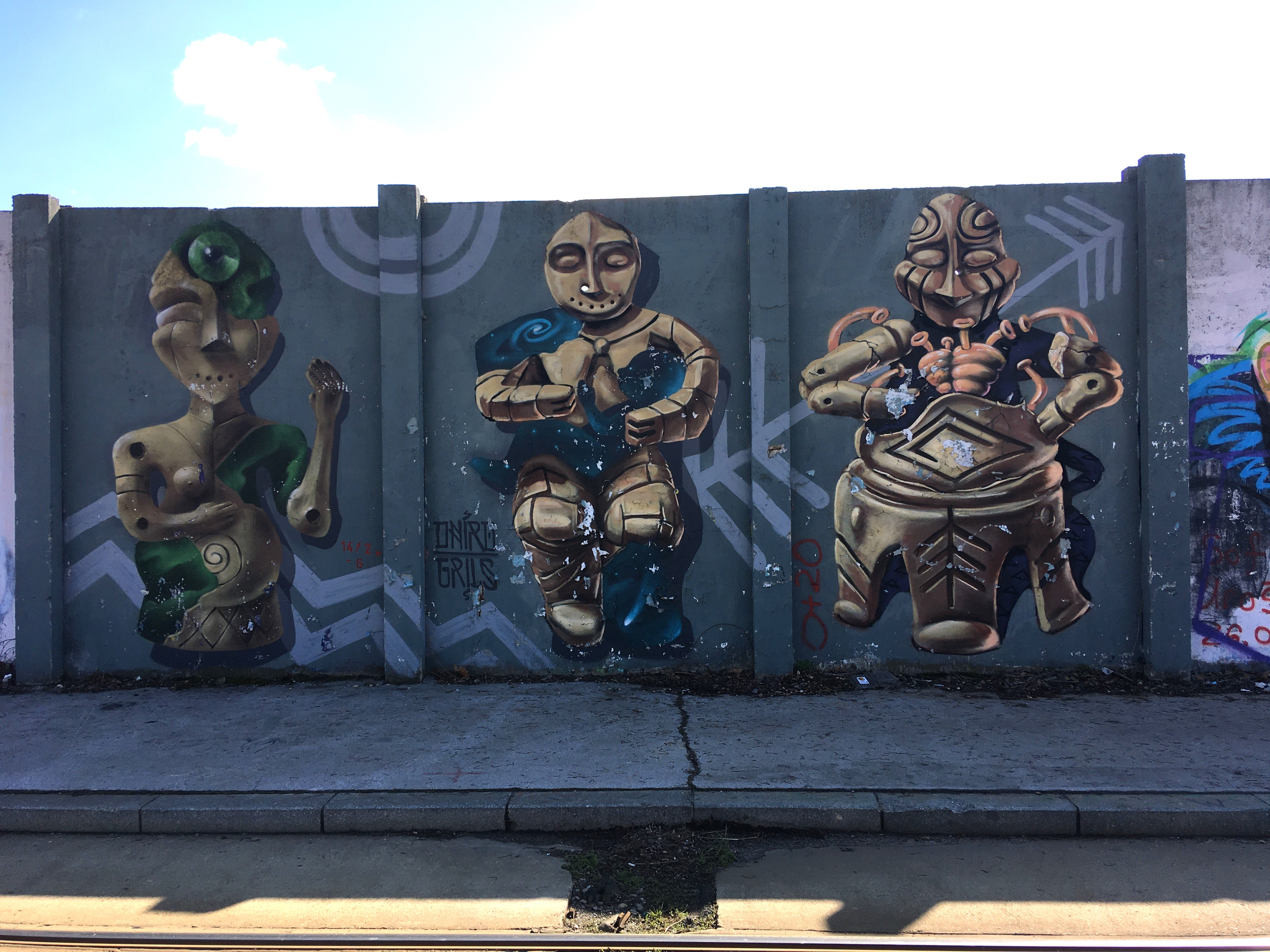
- Vinča-inspired mural in Belgrade
  Old Europe
- Prehistoric Europe
- Sesklo culture
- Tărtăria tablets
- Varna culture
- Vidovdanka
