= Gornja Tuzla =

- Village
- Location within Bosnia and Herzegovina
- Coordinates: 44°33′26.8″N 18°45′44.6″E
- Country: Bosnia and Herzegovina
- Entity: Federation of Bosnia and Herzegovina
- Canton: Tuzla
- Municipality: Tuzla

Area
  - Total: 5.38 sq mi (13.93 km^{2})

Population (2013)
  - Total: 3,017
  - Density: 560.9/sq mi (216.6/km^{2})
- Time zone: UTC+1 (CET)
  - Summer (DST): UTC+2 (CEST)
- Area code: +387 (35)

Gornja Tuzla (English: Upper Tuzla) is a town east of Tuzla, Bosnia and Herzegovina. Its neighboring town is Simin Han.

== History ==
There is evidence of the prehistoric Vinča culture being present in Gornja Tuzla as early as 5200 BC. The present-day city of Tuzla was first granted status as a town by the reigning Ottoman Empire in 1477. The kadžiluk of Tuzla was established in 1573, with headquarters in Gornja Tuzla. In the mid-seventeenth century, the seat of the kadžiluk was transferred to Donja Tuzla. Gornja Tuzla was part of the Empire's Sanjak of Zvornik in the Bosnia Vilayet. The Hadži Iskenderova mosque in the center of town, built in the 1500s, still stands today.

In about 1884 Austria-Hungary began boring salt in Gornja Tuzla, Simin Han and Donja Tuzla. On 3 October 1943, a day after the city of Tuzla was liberated, Gornja Tuzla was liberated by the 16th Vojvodina Division of the Yugoslav Partisans.

== Demographics ==
According to the 2013 census, its population was 3,017.

Ethnicity in 2013
Ethnicity	Number	Percentage
Bosniaks	2,872	95.2%
Croats	32	1.1%
Serbs	1	0.0%
other/undeclared	112	3.7%
Total	3,017	100%
