= Vidovdanka =

Late Mesolithic anthropomorphic figurine

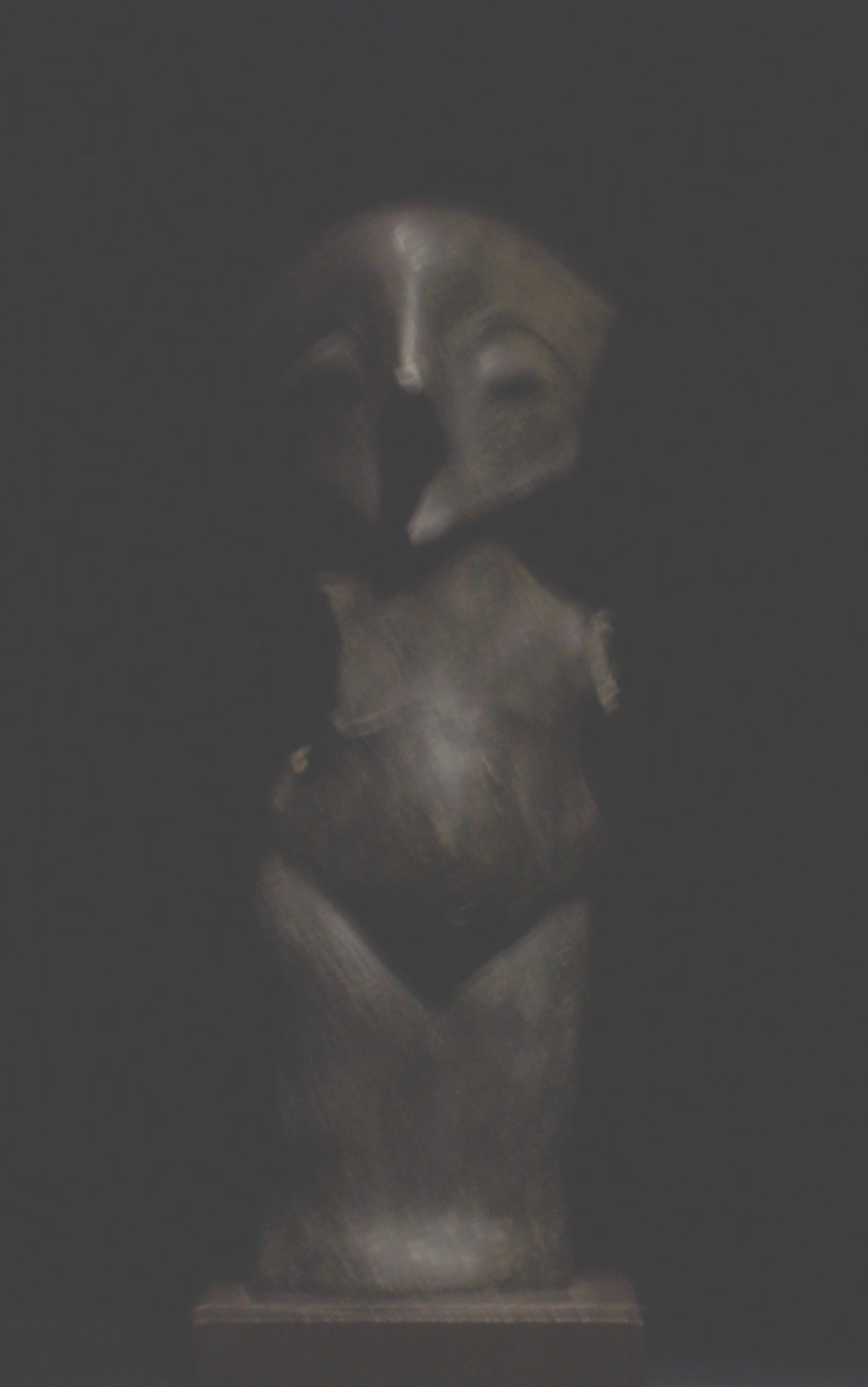
- Pieces of the Antrea Net
- Material: Terracotta
- Height: 30.7 cm
- Created: c. 5,100 BC
- Discovered: 28 June 1930; Vinca, Serbia

Vidovdanka is a Neolithic anthropomorphic figurine (cult image) made of terracotta regarded as symbol of the Vinča culture, which flourished in prehistoric Serbia in 5500 BC. It was excavated at 6.2 metres (20 ft) deep in Vinča, Serbia on the day of Vidovdan (hence the name) in 1930. It stands 30.7 centimetres (12.1 in) tall.
