= Gomolava =

Archaeological site in Serbia

Coordinates: 44.8884°N 19.7483°E

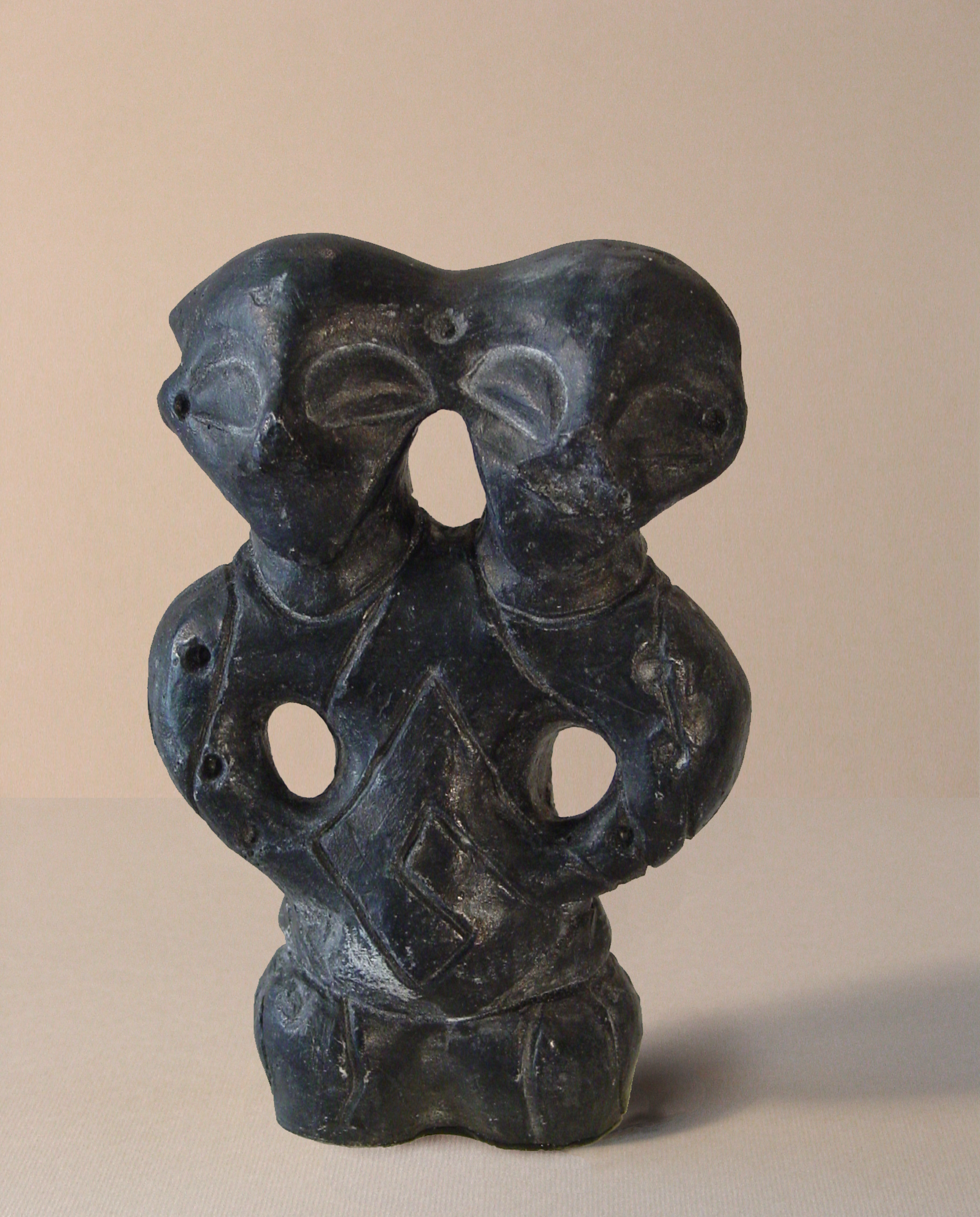
A statuette from Gomolava

Gomolava is a Vinča culture site on the Sava River in Serbia. It is dated to 4000–3800 B.C.
