= Divostin =

Divostin Дивостин (Serbian)
- Village
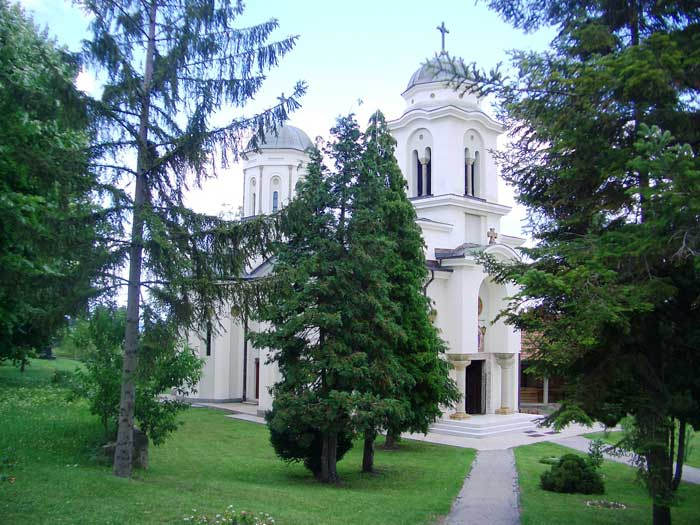
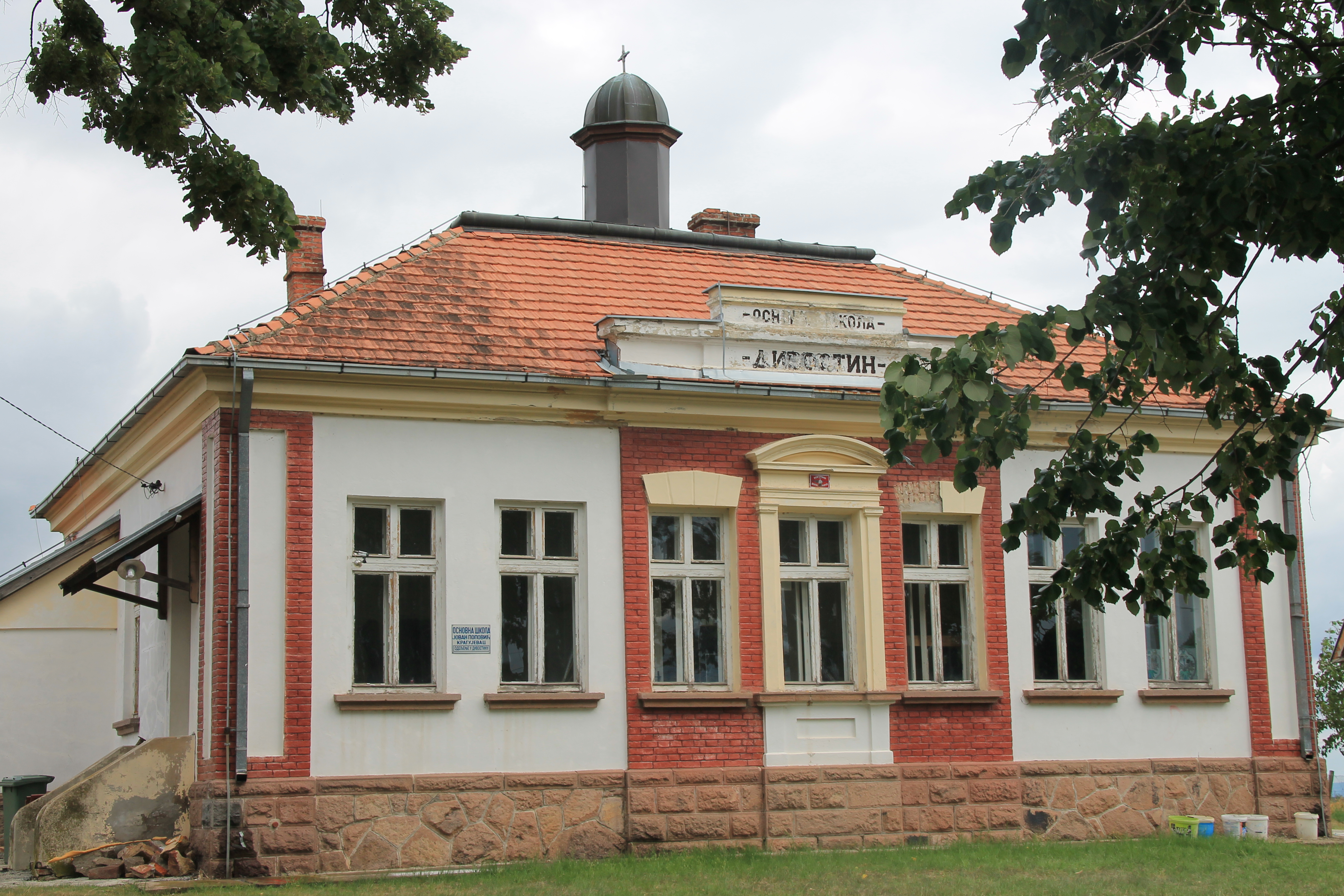
- Divostin

- Location within Serbia
- Coordinates: 44°01′N 20°51′E
- Country: Serbia
- District: Šumadija
- Municipality: Stanovo

Area
  - Total: 5.37 km^{2} (2.07 sq mi)
- Elevation: 229 m (751 ft)

Population (2011)
  - Total: 422
  - Density: 78.6/km^{2} (204/sq mi)
- Time zone: UTC+1 (CET)
  - Summer (DST): UTC+2 (CEST)
- Postal code: 34204
- Area code: 034

Divostin (Serbian Cyrillic: Дивостин) is a village of the city of Kragujevac in the Šumadija district of Serbia. According to the 2011 census, there were 422 inhabitants.

Over 100,000 Neolithic objects from Starčevo culture and Vinča culture were extracted in a number of searches between 1959 and 1971. Ceramics of the Cernavodă culture dating to the Early and Middle Bronze Age have been found in Divostin.

The Flores company, a producer of exported rakija, is headquartered in Divostin.
