= Pločnik (archaeological site) =

Archaeological site in Serbia

Coordinates: 43.2106°N 21.3647°E

Pločnik (archaeological site) is located in Pločnik, Prokuplje village in the Toplica District of Serbia. A 120 hectare settlement belonging to the Neolithic Vinča culture existed on the site from 5500 BCE until it was destroyed by fire in 4700 BCE.

== History ==
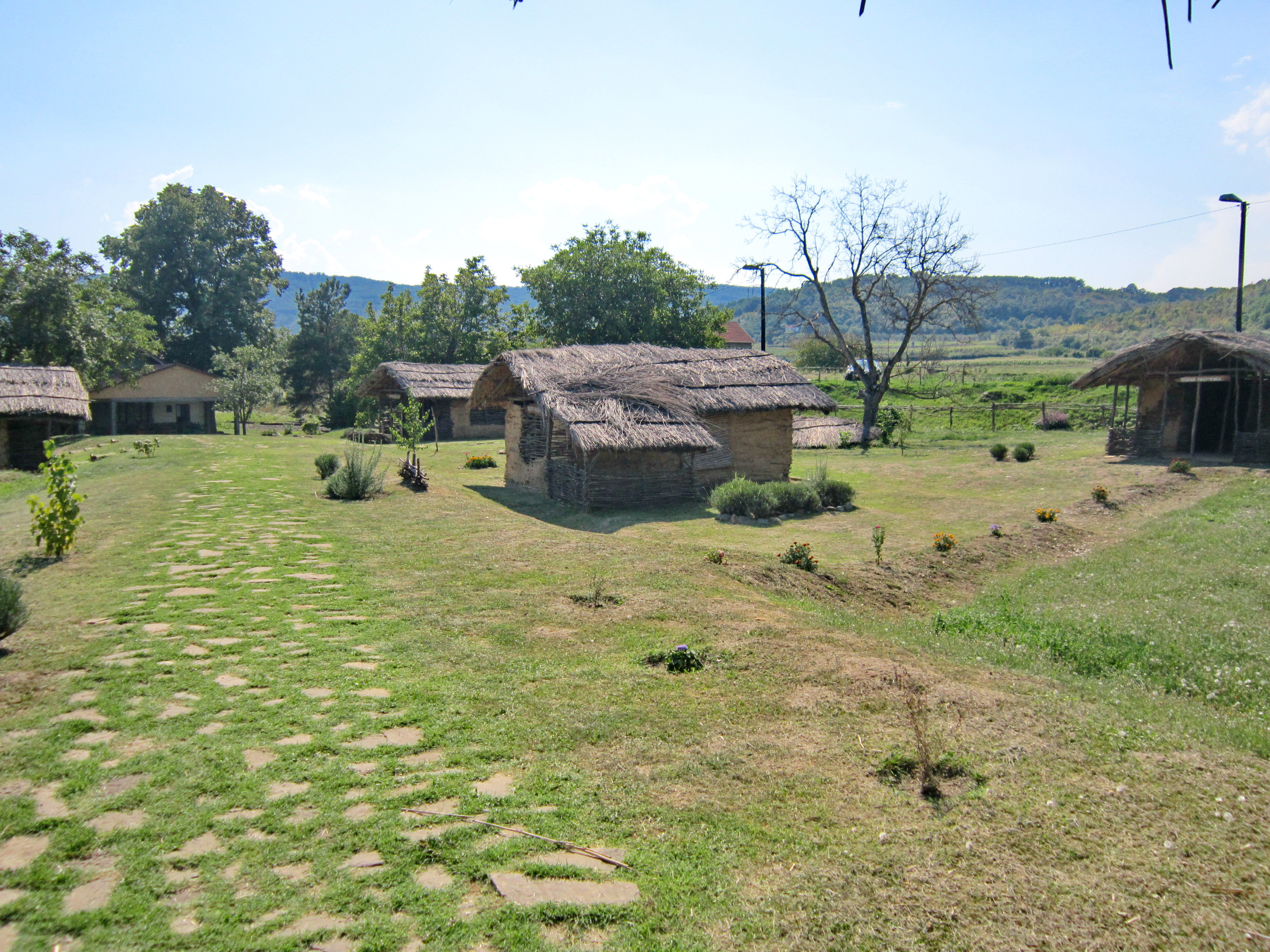
Reconstructed Vinča culture houses at Pločnik

The Vinča houses at Pločnik had stoves and special holes specifically for rubbish, and the dead were buried in cemeteries. People slept on woollen mats and fur and made clothes of wool, flax and leather. The figurines found not only represent deities but many show the daily life of the inhabitants while crude pottery finds appear to have been made by children. Women are depicted in short tops and skirt wearing jewellery. A thermal well found near the settlement might be evidence of Europe's oldest spa.

=== Metallurgy ===
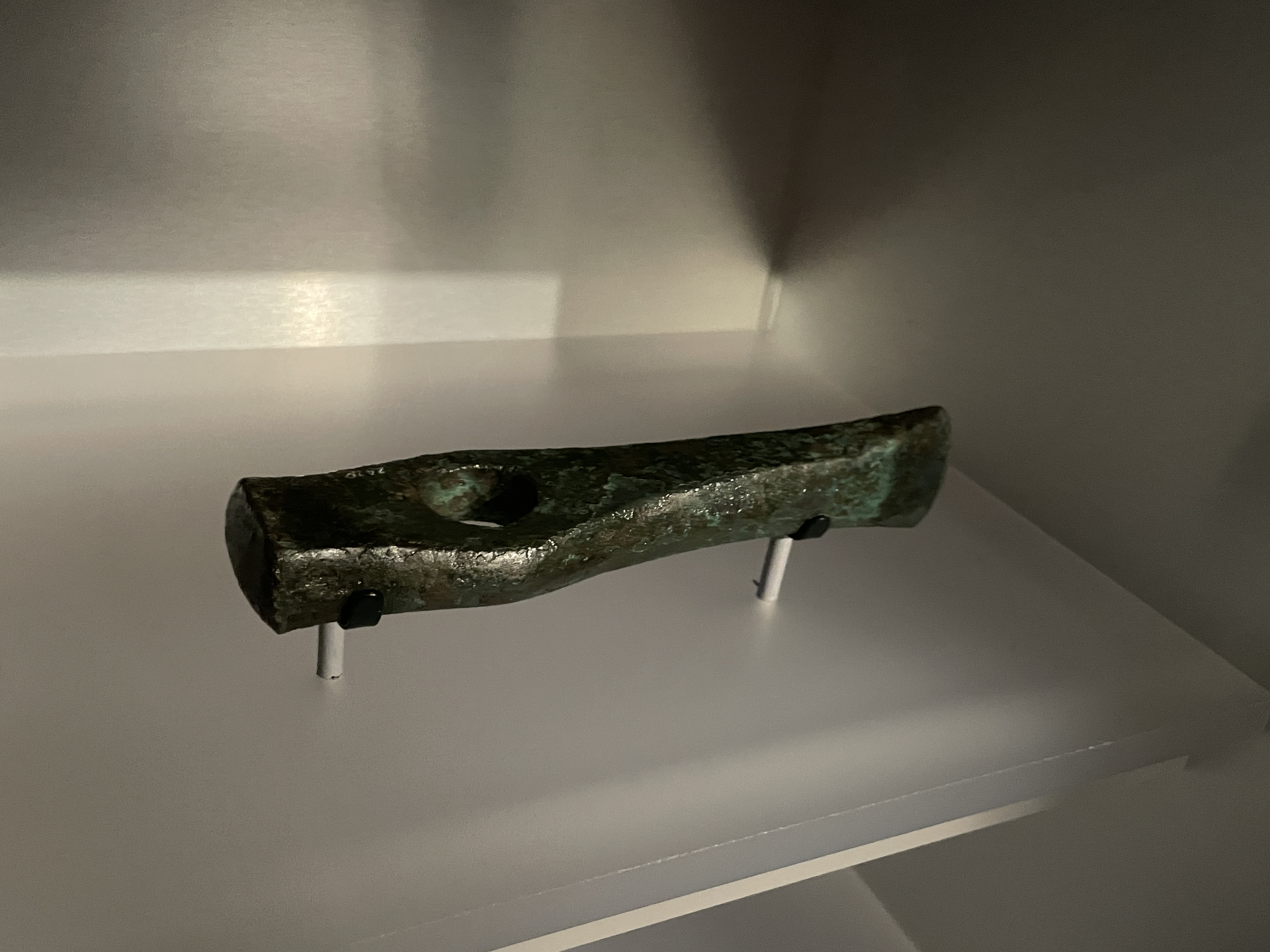
Copper axe from Pločnik, c. 5000 BC

In 2007 it was reported that a preliminary dating of a Pločnik copper workshop with a furnace and copper tools to 5,500 BCE, if correct, indicated the Copper Age could have started in Europe 500 years or more earlier than previously thought. The sophisticated furnace and smelter featured earthen pipe-like air vents with hundreds of tiny holes in them. Also there was a chimney to ensure that air goes into the furnace to feed the fire, and smoke comes out away from the workers. Copper workshops from later periods thought to indicate the beginning of the Copper Age were less advanced, lacked chimneys and workers blew air on the fire with bellows.

In 2008, a copper axe was found at Pločnik that was dated to 5,500 BC. This pushed back the start of the Copper Age by 500 years.

A study published in December 2013 reported an in situ discovery of a tin bronze foil from Plocnik dated to c. 4650 BC. This is the oldest tin bronze so far found in the world - a significant technological advance.

This discovery was further supported by a reanalysis of 14 other tin bronze artefacts from neighbouring sites in Bulgaria and Serbia dated to before 4000 BC. This showed that early tin bronze was more common than previously thought, and developed independently in Europe 1,500 years before the first tin bronze alloys in the Near East.

Another artifact similar to the Pločnik foil is a bronze ring from Gomolava in Serbia. When analyzed, the ring showed that it has above 8% tin content. The Pločnik foil has 11.7% tin. Tin bronzes above 8% tin require high annealing temperatures in the range of 500–800C, so these were the temperatures already achieved at that time. These are considerably higher than the temperatures needed for the production of copper artifacts.

According to the authors, the next horizon of bronzes in Serbia is dated to the third millennium BC, so this means there was a significant interruption, when this technology appears to have been lost. In Bulgaria, on the other hand, the production of bronze continued in the fourth millennium BC, but only arsenic bronzes were produced; so this was a different technology. In Serbia, likewise, mostly arsenical bronzes were produced in later times.

== Excavations ==
The site was first discovered during railway construction in 1927, but was investigated only sporadically until excavations carried out by the Prokuplje Museum the National Museum of Serbia began in 1996.

== See also ==
- Old Europe (archaeology)
