= Crkvina (Kruševac) =

Coordinates: 43°32′20″N 21°28′58″E

- Village
- Interactive map of Crkvina (Kruševac)
- Country: Serbia
- District: Rasina District
- Municipality: Kruševac

Population (2002)
  - Total: 210
- Time zone: UTC+1 (CET)
  - Summer (DST): UTC+2 (CEST)

Crkvina is a village in the municipality of Kruševac, Serbia. According to the 2002 census, the village has a population of 210 people.
