= Kamenica, Kragujevac =

Coordinates: 44.0667°N 20.6500°E

Kamenica Каменица (Serbian)
- Village
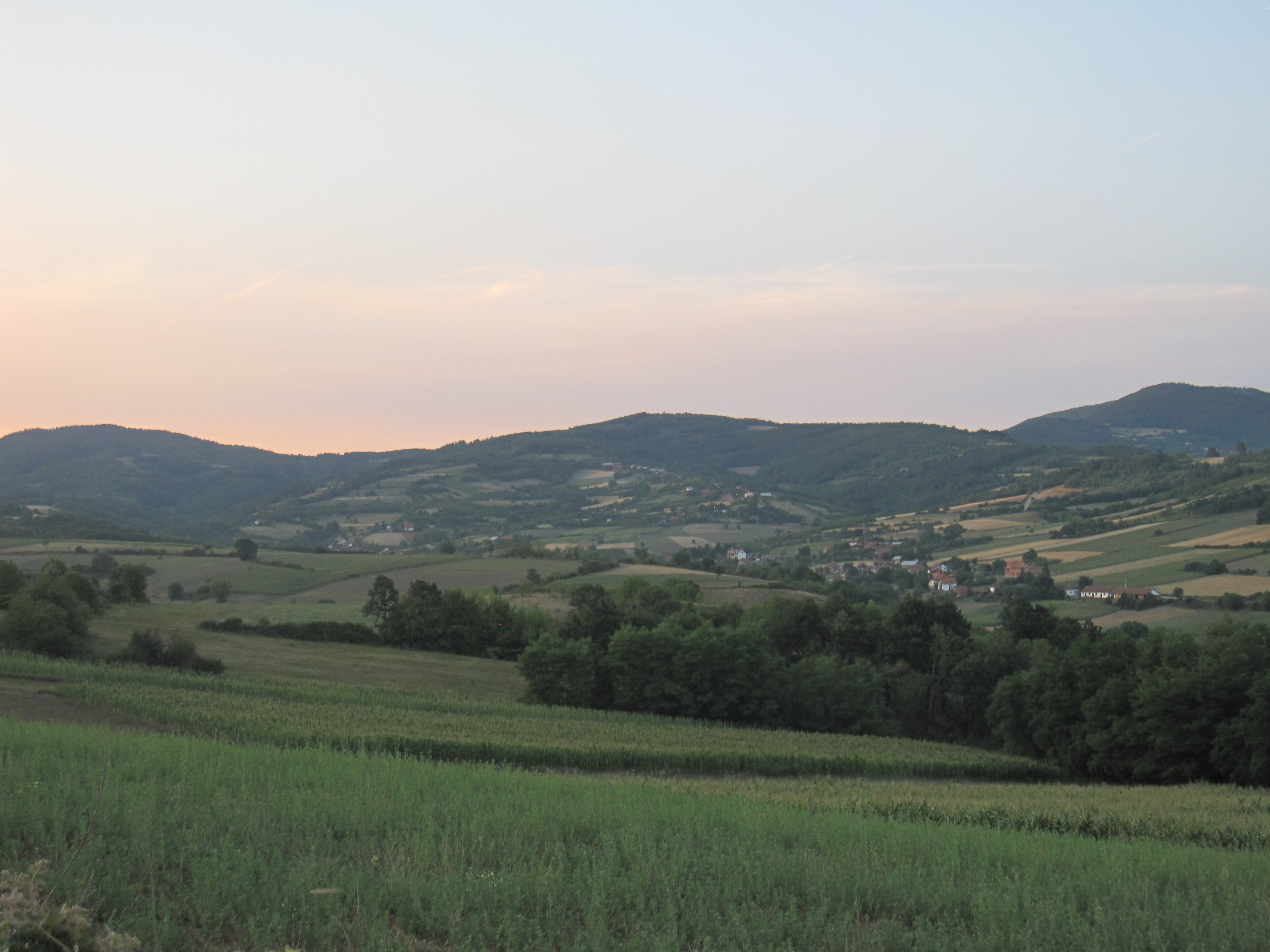
- Interactive map of Kamenica
- Country: Serbia
- District: Šumadija District
- City: Kragujevac
- Municipality: Stragari

Population (2011)
  - Total: 329
- Time zone: UTC+1 (CET)
  - Summer (DST): UTC+2 (CEST)

Kamenica (Serbian: Каменица) is a village in the administrative area of city of Kragujevac, Serbia (Stragari municipality). According to the 2011 census, the village has a population of 329 people.
