= Early history of Bosnia and Herzegovina =

Within the boundaries of today's Bosnia and Herzegovina, there have been many layers of prehistoric cultures whose creation and disappearance are linked to migrations of unidentified ethnic groups.

== Prehistory ==
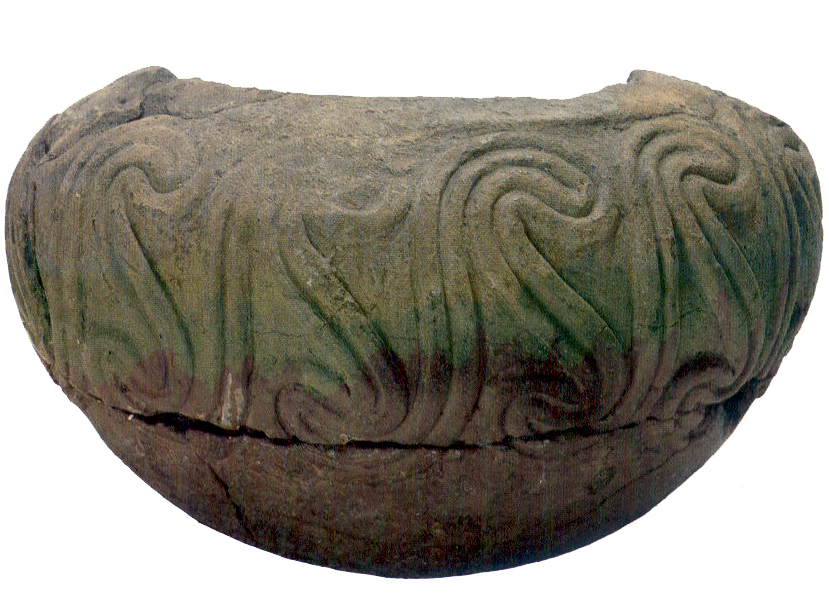
The vase from Butmir near Sarajevo, early Neolithic

The Paleolithic in Bosnia is marked by the oldest Paleolithic monument in southeastern Europe, the engravings in Badanj Cave near Stolac in Herzegovina. A magnificent one is Horse attacked by arrows, preserved in fragments and dated around 14000 – 12000 BC.

During the time when Neolithic cultures were appearing in Bosnia and Herzegovina, there existed interesting mixtures of Mediterranean and Pannonian cultures. Herzegovina was under the influence of impresso ceramics from the western Mediterranean, as seen in Green Cave near Mostar, Čairi near Stolac, Lisičići near Konjic and Peć Mlini near Grude. People then lived in caves or simple settlements on hilltops. On the upper mainstream of the Bosna river and in northeast parts of Bosnia (Obre I near Kakanj), people lived in wooden houses built by the river. In this culture we can see influences from Adriatic cultures in the south and the Starčević culture in the northeast. Original expressions of Kakanj culture are ceramic pots on four legs, called rhyton. We can also find them in the Danilo culture on the Croatian coast. Due to these objects, Kakanj culture is considered a part of the wide circle of Neolithic populations that followed a cult of life force (from northern Italy, Dalmatia and Epirus to the Aegean). The Butmir culture near Sarajevo is distinctive, with fine glazed ceramics and miscellaneous geometrical decorations (often spirals). Figures from Butmir are unique sculptures modeled with hand; heads are almost like portraits with emphasized parts of body.

Bronze Age settlements in Herzegovina were built like citadels (natively called gradina), and in Bosnia we have necropolises with stone tumuli. During this time, bronze arms, decorated plates, flat necklaces, and fibulas were decorated with a specific geometrical style of engraved ornament.

== Illyrian period ==
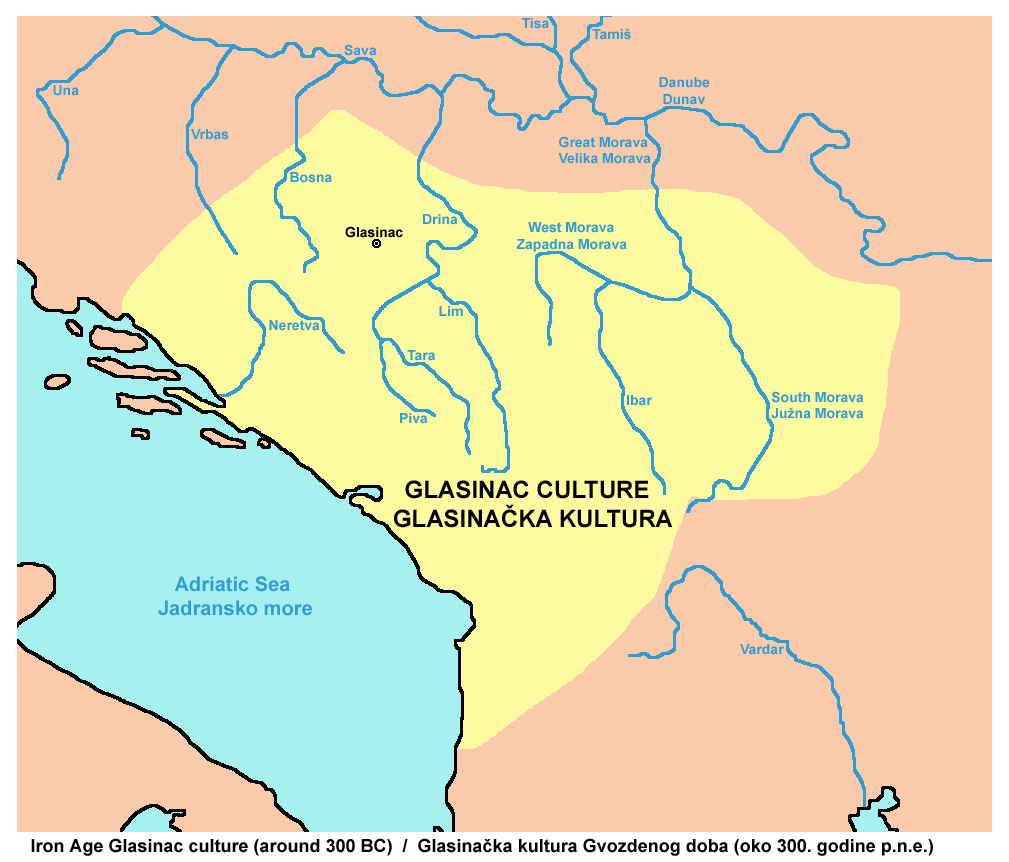
Iron Age Glasinac culture (around 300 BC).

The bronze culture of the Illyrians, an ethnic group with a distinct culture and art form, started to organize itself in today's Slovenia, Croatia, Bosnia and Herzegovina, Serbia, Kosovo, Montenegro, Albania and parts of northern Greece.

From 8th century BC, Illyrian tribes evolved into kingdoms. The earliest recorded kingdom in Illyria (a region in the western part of the Balkan Peninsula inhabited by the Illyrians, as recorded in classical antiquity) was that of the Enchele in the 8th century BC. The era in which we observe other Illyrian kingdoms begins approximately at 400 BC and ends at 167 BC.[7] The Autariatae under Pleurias (337 BC) were considered to have been a kingdom.[8] The Kingdom of the Ardiaei (originally a tribe from the Neretva valley region) began at 230 BC and ended at 167 BC.[9] The most notable Illyrian kingdoms and dynasties were those of Bardyllis of the Dardani and of Agron of the Ardiaei who created the last and best-known Illyrian kingdom.[10] Agron ruled over the Ardiaei and had extended his rule to other tribes as well.

From the 7th century BC, bronze was replaced by iron, after which only jewelry and art objects were still made out of bronze. Illyrian tribes, under the influence of Hallstatt cultures to the north, formed regional centers that were slightly different. A very important role in their life was the cult of the dead, which is seen in their careful burials and burial ceremonies, as well as the richness of their burial sites. In northern parts, there was a long tradition of cremation and burial in shallow graves, while in the south the dead were buried in large stone or earth tumuli (natively called gromile) that in Herzegovina were reaching monumental sizes, more than 50 m wide and 5 m high. Japodian tribes had an affinity to decoration (heavy, oversized necklaces out of yellow, blue or white glass paste, and large bronze fibulas, as well as spiral bracelets, diadems and helmets out of bronze foil).

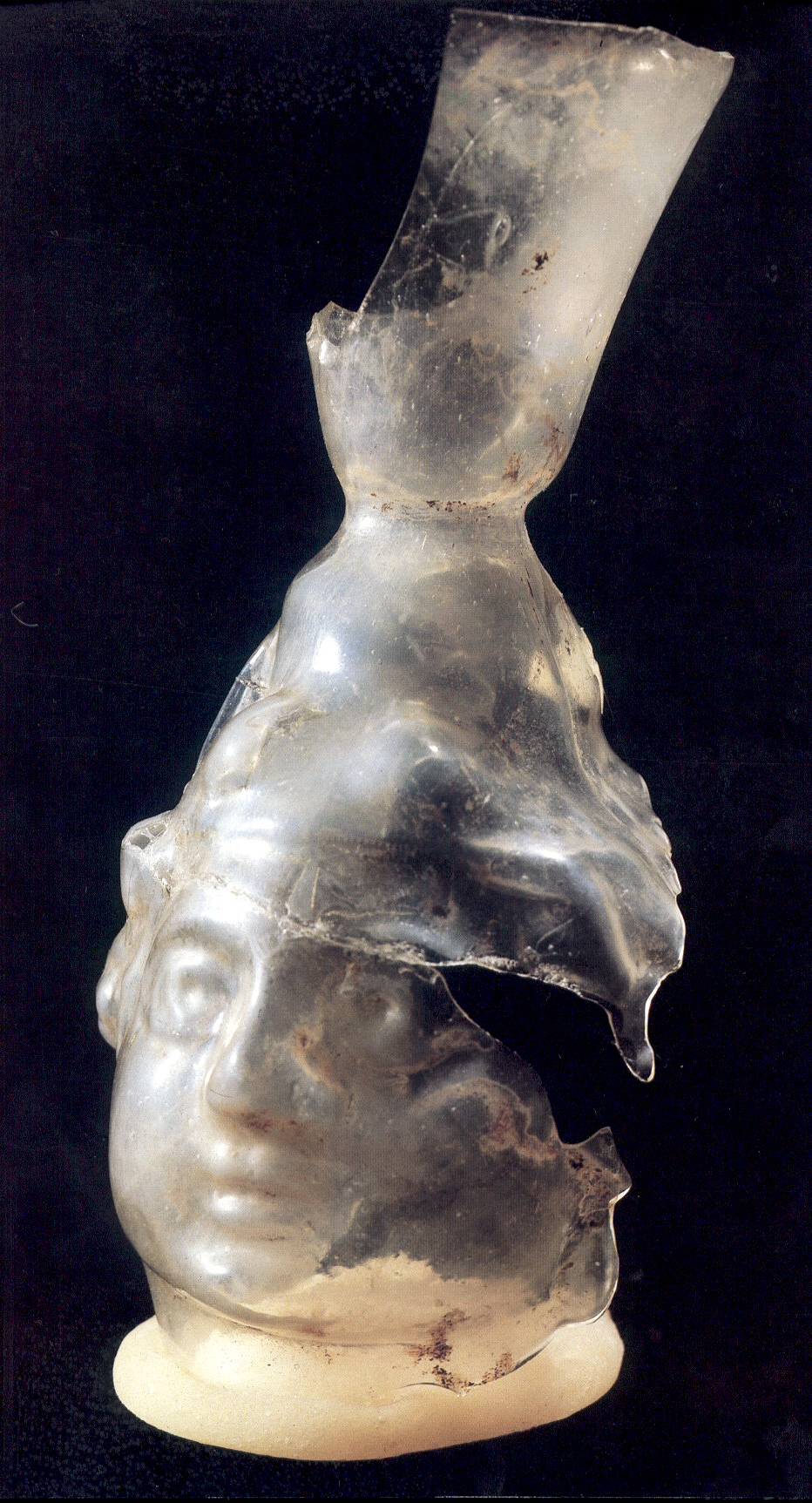
Roman glass found in Bosanski Novi from the 2nd century

In the 4th century BC, the first invasion of Celts is recorded. They brought the technique of the pottery wheel, new types of fibulas and different bronze and iron belts. They only passed on their way to Greece, so their influence in Bosnia and Herzegovina is negligible. Celtic migrations displaced many Illyrian tribes from their former lands, but some Celtic and Illyrian tribes mixed. Concrete historical evidence for this period is scarce, but overall it appears that the region was populated by a number of different peoples speaking distinct languages.

In the Neretva Delta in the south, there were important Hellenistic influence of the Illyrian Daors tribe. Their capital was Daorson in Ošanići near Stolac, the main center of ancient culture in B&H. Daorson in the 4th century BC was surrounded by megalithic, 5 m high stonewalls (as large as those of Mycenae in Greece), composed of large trapezoid stone blocks. Daors made unique bronze coins and sculptures.

== Roman period ==
Conflict between the Illyrians and ancient Romans started in 229 BC. In the year 168 BC, the land of Illyrians became the Roman province of Illyricum. Rome completed its annexation of the region in 9 A.D, ending a three-year rebellion of Illyrians against Romans. In the year 10 A.D., Illyria was divided and the northern strip of today's Bosnia along the south side of the Sava River became part of the new province of Pannonia. The rest of what is today Bosnia, Herzegovina, Montenegro, Dalmatia, and western Serbia became part of the Roman province of Dalmatia.

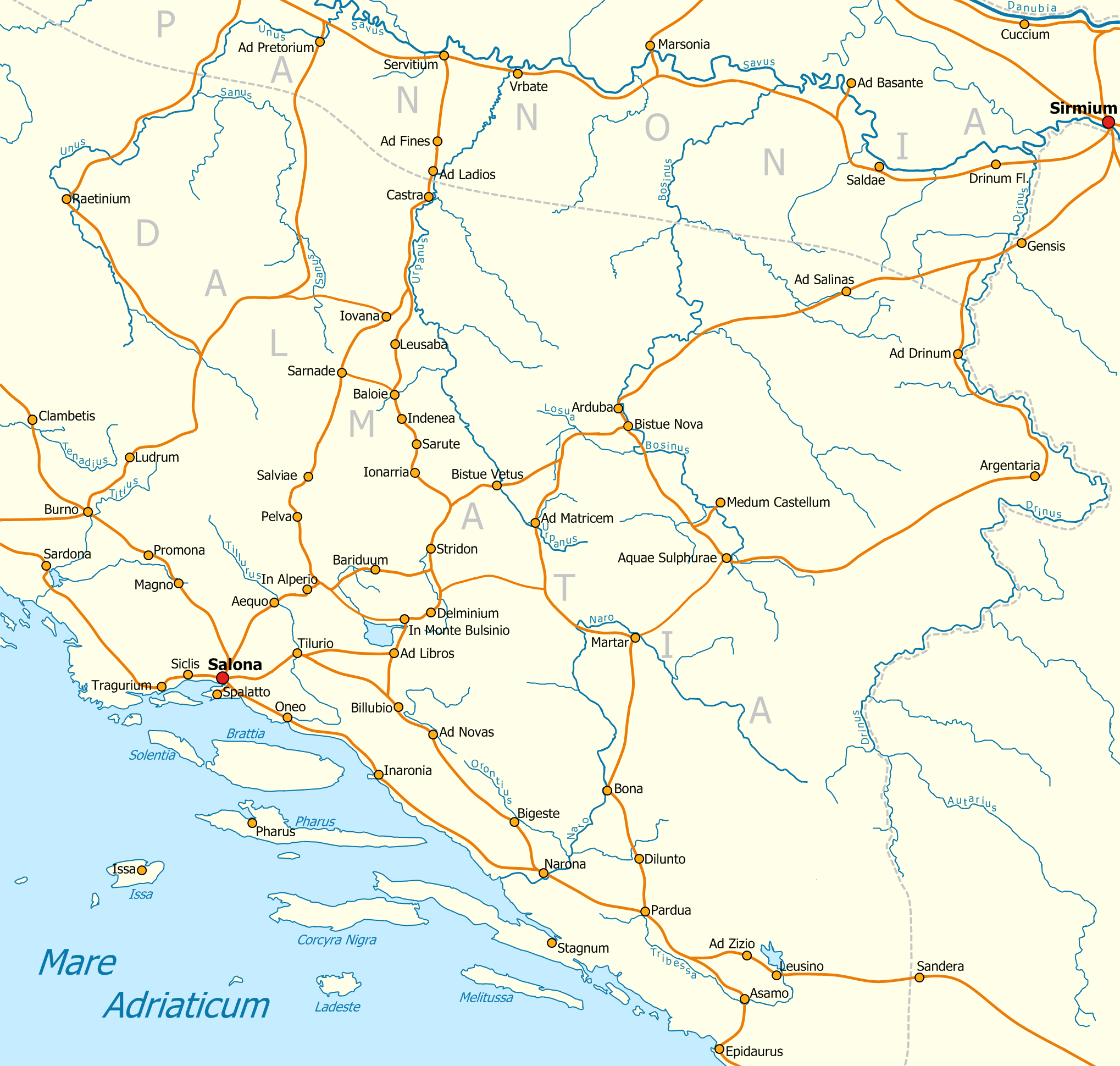
Map of ancient settlements and roads in Bosnia and Herzegovina

In the Roman period, Latin-speaking settlers from all over the Roman Empire settled among the Illyrians and Roman soldiers were encouraged to retire in the region. Several towns of today's Bosnia were founded under Roman rule. For example, the town of Blagaj on the Buna River is built on the site of the Roman town of Bona. Roman Bosnia enjoyed a huge development, with many "Roman via" and "castra" and an economy based on the exploitation of mines. Following Roman rule there was a large number of Vlachs who were descended from a pre-Slavic population. Related to Romanians and originally speaking a language related to Romanian, the Vlachs are now Slavic speaking.

Christianity had already arrived in the region by the end of the 1st century, and numerous artifacts and objects from the time testify to this. Following events from the years 337 and 395, when the Roman Empire split, Dalmatia and Pannonia were included in the Western Roman Empire. The region was conquered by Huns, and later by the Ostrogoths in 455. The Ostrogoth Kingdom was defeated by Byzantine Empire in the Gothic War (535–553) by the Emperor Justinian I, and the area was re-conquered for the Byzantine Empire.

== Sources ==
- Noel Malcolm, Bosnia A Short History, Macmillan London Limited, 1994.
- “Umjetničko Blago Bosne i Hercegovine”, several authors, Svjetlost, Sarajevo, 1987.
