= Okolište (Neolithic site) =

Largest neolithic Butmir culture site

- Okolišće
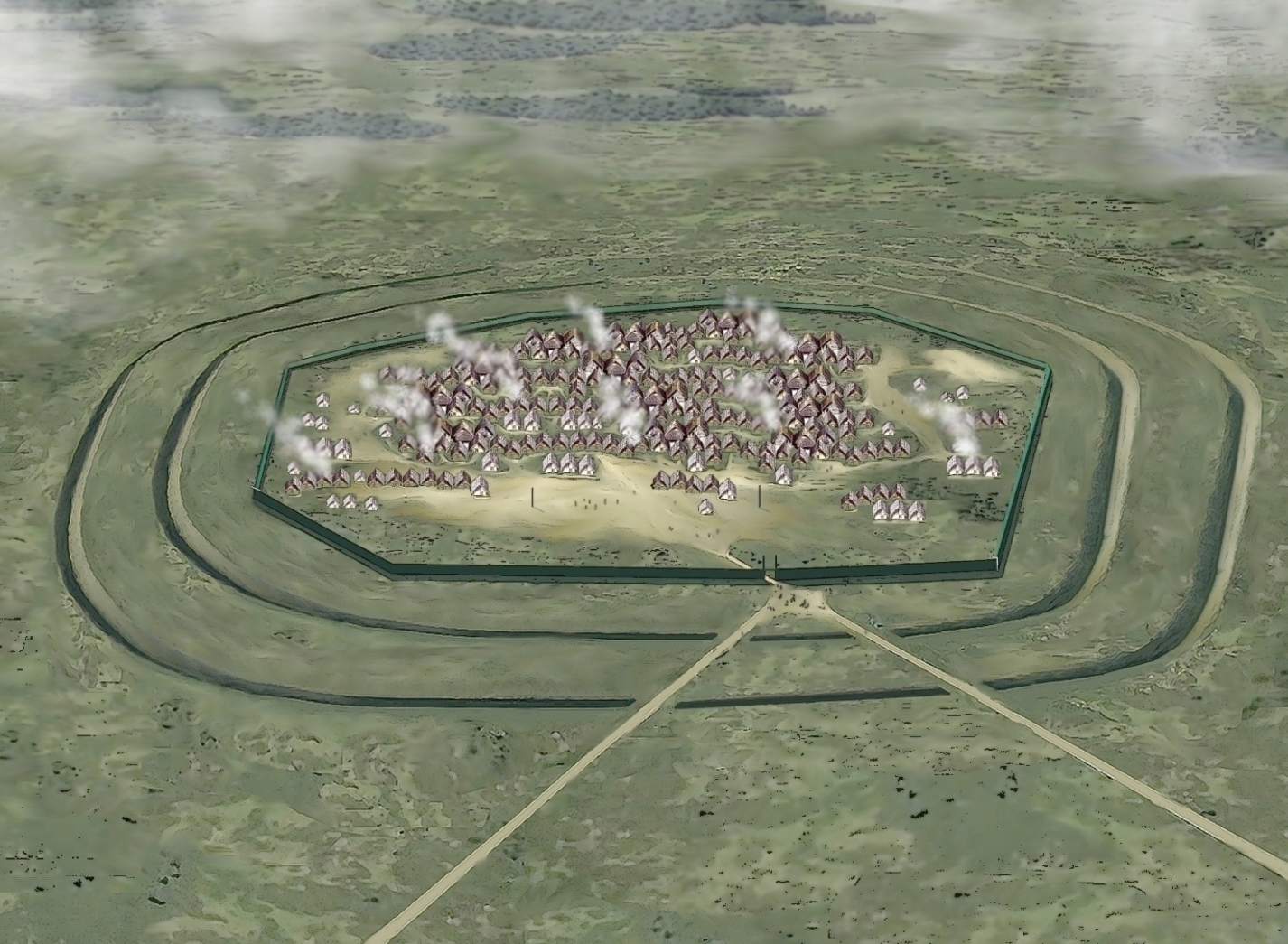
- Neolithic settlement Okolište

- Location within Bosnia and Herzegovina
- 44.0336°N 18.1429°E
- Type: Neolithic settlement
- Periods: Neolithic Europe
- Cultures: Butmir
- Associated with: 1,500-3,500 occupants
- Location: Visoko, Zenica-Doboj Canton, Bosnia and Herzegovina
- Region: Central Bosnia

History
- Built: c. 5200 BC
- Abandoned: Early Bronze Age

Site notes
- Area: 7 ha (17 acres)
- Excavation dates: 2002-2008
- Archaeologists: Robert Hofmann; Johannes Müller; Knut Rassmann; Zilka Vejzagić-Kujundžić
- Discovered: 2002

Okolište is a Neolithic site, located in the municipality of Visoko, Bosnia and Herzegovina. It was proclaimed a national monument of Bosnia and Herzegovina. It is the largest Butmir culture site. Excavations have identified at least nine phases in settlement history.

== Location ==
The Visoko Basin is situated 40 km northwest of Sarajevo. The basin is crossed by the river Bosna and is 400–410 m above sea level. The basin is encircled by Miocene mountains of up to 1000 m height. Within the Visoko Basin, about 15 Middle and Late Neolithic sites are known by surveys and earlier excavations.

== Research ==
Field work focused on the site of Okolište, located in the northern part of the Visoko basin, was carried out during several campaigns from 2002 to 2008. Due to its size of about 7 hectares, this settlement is categorized as a central place within the Visoko basin, which has several other Neolithic sites, such as those in Donje Moštre and Arnautovići.

The Neolithic settlement of Okolište is situated between the villages of Radinovići and Okolište, about 6 km northwest of Visoko. There are a total of 36 sites of Butmir culture in the river valleys of the Bosna and Neretva. The biggest settlement in the Sarajevo basin is located in Butmir, while the largest settlement in the Visoko basin is in Okolište, with an area of 7-5 hectares.

The Visoko basin, along with the neighboring Kakanj, was a core region of the Neolithic settlement of Central Bosnia. The area has seen a distinct increase in the number and total area of settlements dating back to around 5200 BC or earlier.

The research was carried out in cooperation with the Roman-German Commission of the German Archaeological Institute in Frankfurt and the University of Bamberg and Kiel and the City Museum in Visoko. Geomagnetic prospecting clearly shows a greater number of protective ditches and showed a clearly visible structure of 54 houses. Their length ranges between 12 and 13 m, while the width varies between 6 and 8 m. Detailed measurements within individual houses have identified, including walls, multi-room divisions, and two furnaces in each house, which largely coincides with objects known in Neolithic settlement of Obre II.

During excavations, a total of 7 houses were discovered. Within a few houses, there were remains of stoves, single fireplaces, a large number of workshops, ornaments and workshops for making stone tools, and a large number of different pits. The majority of the archaeological material found consists of ceramics. The ceramic pots with the contents of the ornaments and forms belong to the phase Butmir II and the lower phase of Butmir III (Hvar-Lisičići), which dates back to 4800 and 4700 BCE.

The results of the excavations and the geomagnetic survey allow the estimation of the number of houses and of the population size of Okolište. It is estimated that 200 houses existed at the same time in the earlier phase of the settlement. With the assumption that each household consisted of an estimated five individuals, the number of inhabitants can be estimated at approximately 1000. Visoko basin could be home to roughly 3500 individuals who lived here, which corresponds to a population density of 32 inhabitants per sq. km.

Food production in the Late Neolithic Visoko Basin and its surrounding area was based on a combination of agriculture and animal husbandry while hunting was of less importance. Cattle was of great importance to Neolithic population in Visoko basin. Agriculture in Okolište was based on grain cultivation dominated by emmer and einkorn, along with barley, millet and naked wheat.

Within 1 km is another archaeological site Donje Moštre, which apart from neolithic culture, has Chalcolithic artifacts, from a period of Vučedol culture.

== See also ==
- Early history of Bosnia and Herzegovina
- Butmir culture
- Kakanj culture
