= Butmir culture =

Culture in Butmir, Bosnia and Herzegovina

- Horizon: Old Europe
- Geographical range: Central Bosnia
- Period: Neolithic
- Dates: c. 5100 BC – c. 4500 BC
- Major sites: Okolište, Butmir (Ilidža), Obre II (Kakanj), Nebo (Travnik)
- Preceded by: Cardium pottery culture, Danilo culture, Kakanj culture
- Followed by: Vučedol culture

The Butmir culture was a major Neolithic culture in central Bosnia, developed along the shores of the river Bosna, spanning from Sarajevo to Zavidovići. It was discovered in 1893, at the site located in Butmir, in the vicinity of Ilidža, which gave its name to an entire cultural group of the Late Neolithic in central Bosnia, the Butmir culture. It is characterized by its unique elaborately decorated pottery and anthropomorphic Figurines, and is one of the best researched European cultures from 5100 to 4500 BC. It was part of the larger Danube civilization. The largest Butmir site is in Visoko basin, in Okolište.

== History ==
The Butmir culture was discovered in 1893, when Austro-Hungarian authorities began construction on the agricultural college of the University of Sarajevo. Various traces of human settlement were found dating to the Neolithic period. Digs were begun immediately, and lasted until 1896.

The finds caused interest among archaeologists worldwide. They were largely responsible for the International Congress of Archaeology and Anthropology being held in Sarajevo in August 1894. The most impressive finds were the unique ceramics, which are now found in the National Museum of Bosnia and Herzegovina.

The culture disappeared during the Bronze Age.

== Settlements ==
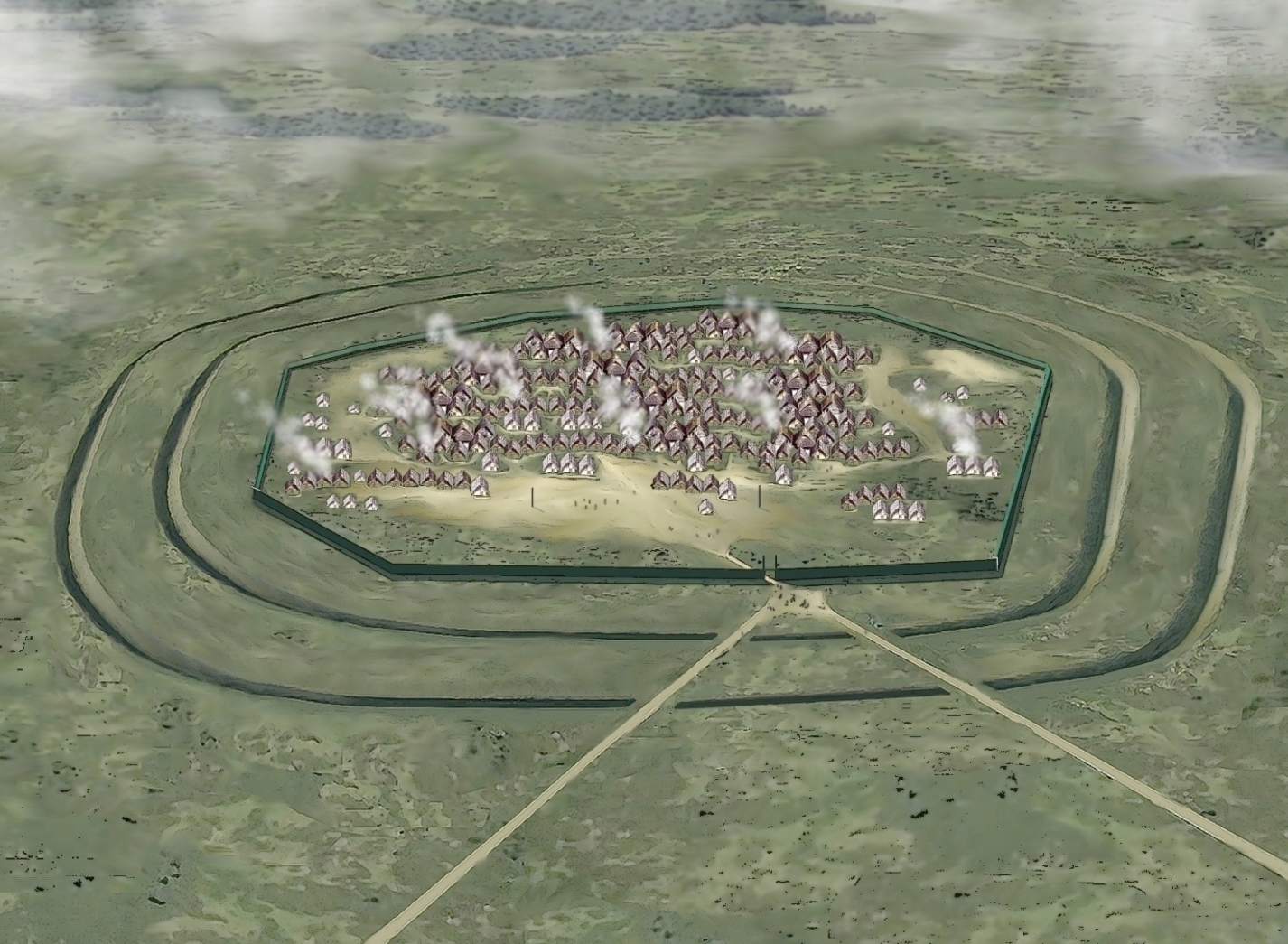
Okolište settlement, reconstruction

Prominent Butmir culture sites include Butmir (Sarajevo), Kraljevine (Novi Šeher), Obre II (Kakanj), Nebo (Travnik), Crkvina (Turbe), Okolište (Visoko), and Brdo (Kiseljak).

According to radiocarbon analysis, occupation of these settlements spanned from 5100 to 4500 BCE:

- Butmir I, 5100 – 4900 BCE
- Butmir II, 4850 – 4750 BCE (settlement in Butmir, results from 1979),
- Butmir III, to 4500. BCE (Gimbutas, 1974, 16) (results from 2002).

The Butmir culture was the home for several large settlements, among them the site of Okolište in Bosnia dating to 5200–4500 BCE, with population estimates between 1,000 and 3,000 people. The settlement was largest in the early phase (5200 BC) with an area of 7.5 hectare, gradually declining to 1.2 hectare by 4500 BC. The site likely consisted of parallel rows of houses ranging from four to ten meters in length. The site also likely had a series of ditches surrounding it with a single entrance.

The site of Okolište would likely have been an egalitarian society with no evidence of social stratification. Most animal remains found in Okolište belong to cattle, while a fair amount belonged to sheep, goats, and pigs. The diet of the Okoliste people consisted mainly of cattle, emmer, einkorn, and lentils. Although there was an importance of agriculture and animal husbandry, wild game was still hunted as a source of food.

Butmir is the oldest Neolithic site in Bosnia and Herzegovina. It was discovered by Austro-Hungarian authorities during the construction of a school in district of Ilidža. The first field work was conducted between 1893 and 1896 by Vjenceslav Radimski and Franjo Fiala. This discovery was monumental, and sparked an international meeting of archaeologists and anthropologists in Sarajevo in August 1894. Houses that were unearthed took the forms of dugouts (or semi-dugouts) and some above ground buildings. The largest number of dugouts was discovered in Butmir itself (90).

The site of Kraljevine in Novi Šeher was explored in 1906–1908, but the results have not been fully published. Excavations unveiled a large number of carved stone axes, which indicates a large workshop center, but there is almost no Neolithic architecture.

Obre near Kakanj was researched from 1963 to 1965, 1967 to 1968, and in 1970 when large, systematic excavations were done in two close locations: Obre I (Raskršće) and Obre II (Gornje polje). Obre I belonged to the Starcevo culture and Kakanj culture groups, while Obre II completely belonged to the Butmir culture.

The main supplement of this neolithic economy was agriculture and animal husbandry. Hunting was of less importance, but also part of daily life. Pottery produced by these people shows they possessed fine workmanship. Decorations are unique to Butmir culture and have many geometric motifs.

== Pottery ==
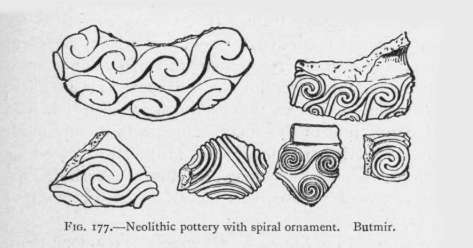
Butmir pottery fragments

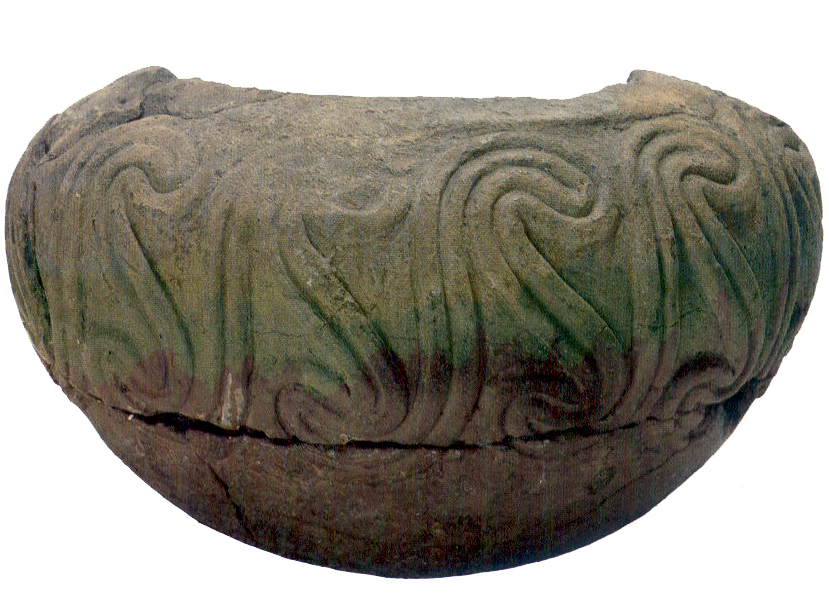
Butmir vase

=== Dishes ===
In the Butmir II phase, the diversity increased significantly. Conical bowls were a standard form of this phase, but there is emergence of conical bowls with a slightly curved upper part. This phase is also represented by oval, semi-lapid and biconical bowl shapes with less curved and shorter cylindrical necks, vases with legs and shallow coarse bowls with a wavy-shaped rims. A special group is pear-shaped vases with a small opening.

The vast majority of ceramic products were simple, intended for storing food supplies, for holding water and for cooking. Only a small number are ceramics that represent a work of art. In terms of surface treatment and decoration of fine ceramic vessels, they can be divided into three groups:

1. Ceramics with dark gray or black gloss finish
2. Style with geometric motifs
3. Style with decorative motifs

=== Sculptures ===
At Butmir sites, 72 human figures made of baked clay were found. They are made in such way so that one can easily identify some racial features. There are 3 main groups of found figures that showed racial characteristics of Negroid, Armenoid and European races. They are mainly female figures. Animal figures are very rare.

== Gallery ==
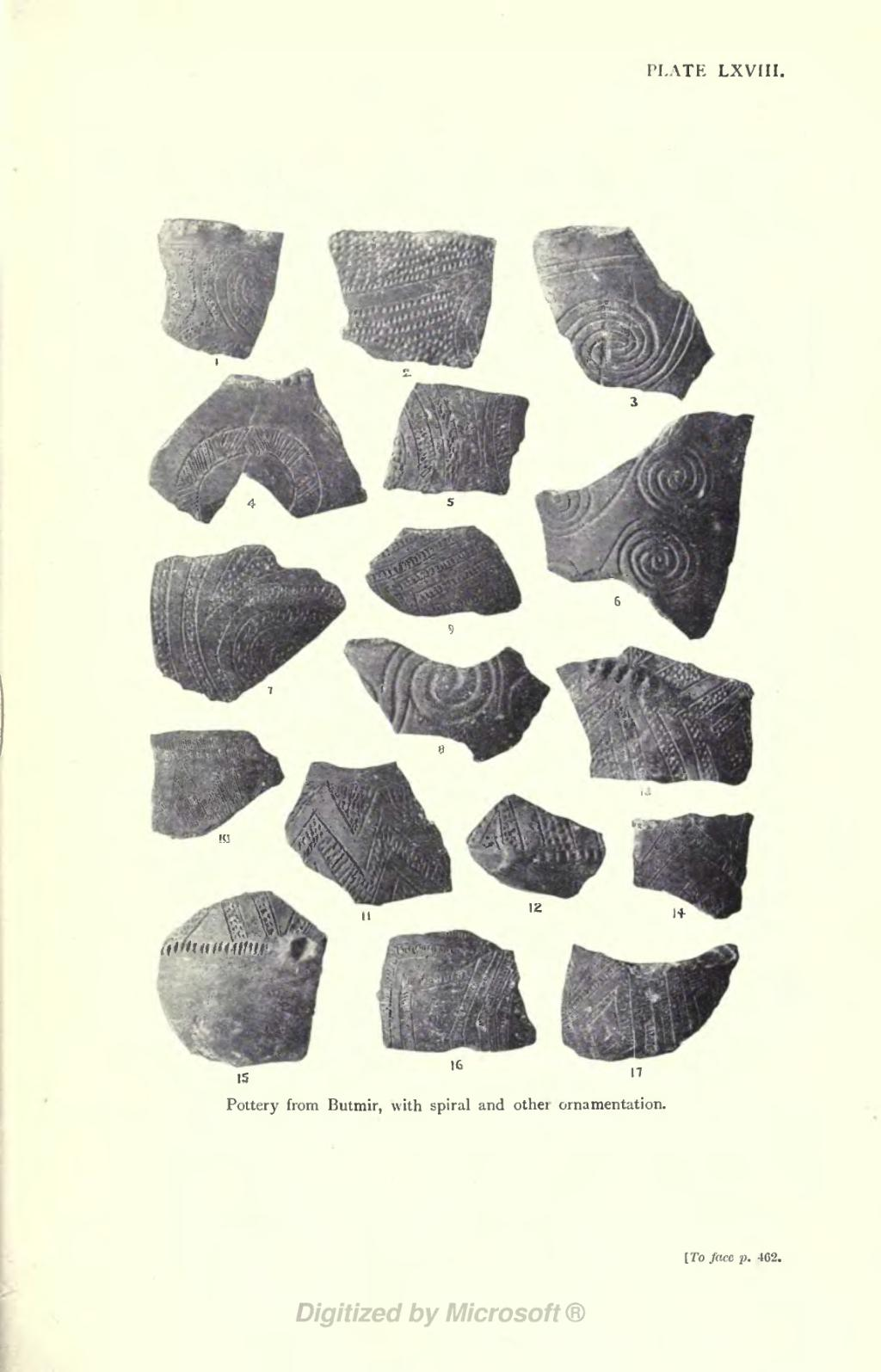
Butmir pottery sherds

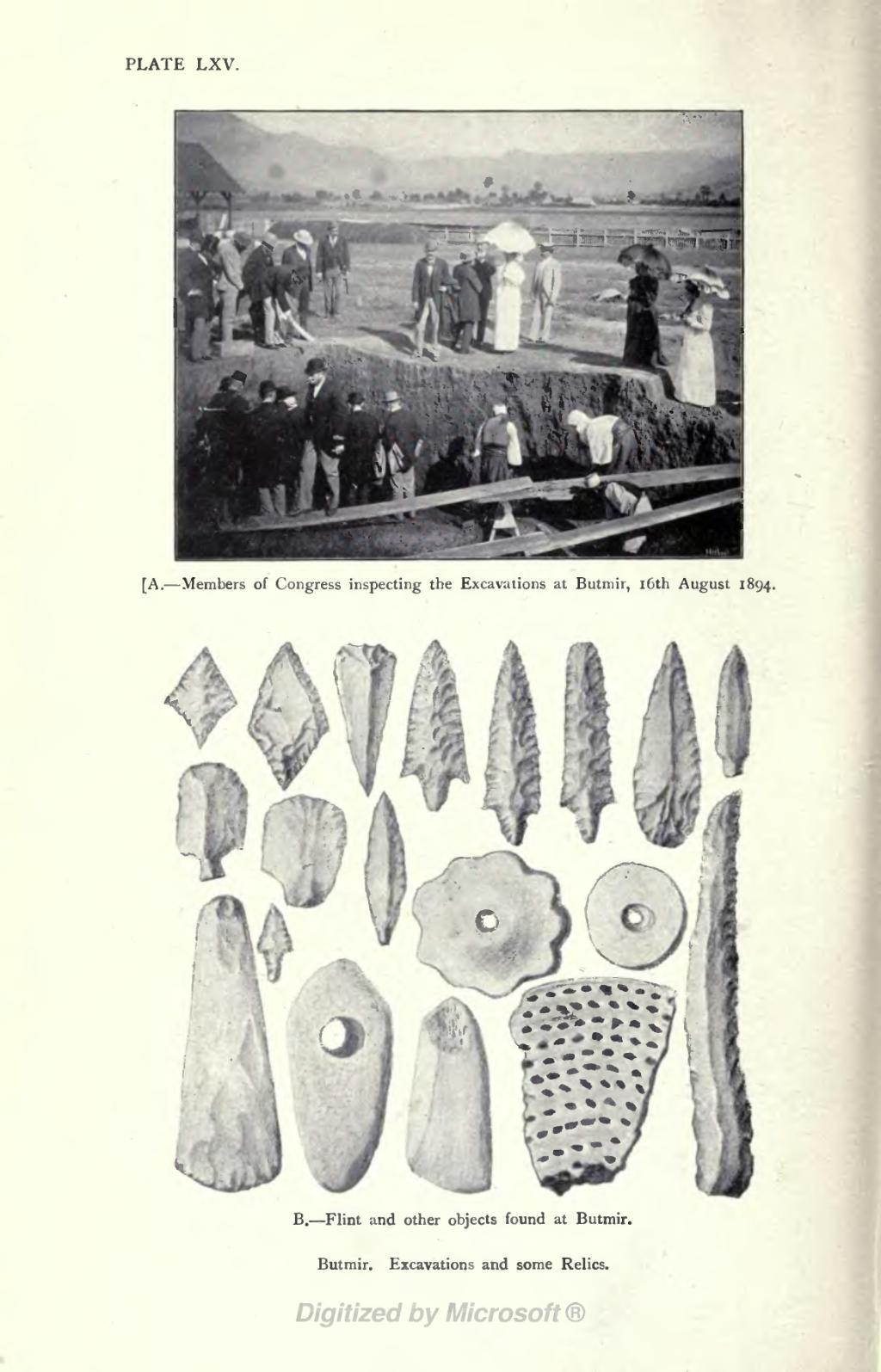
Excavations at Butmir, 16 August 1894. Bottom: artefacts found at Butmir.

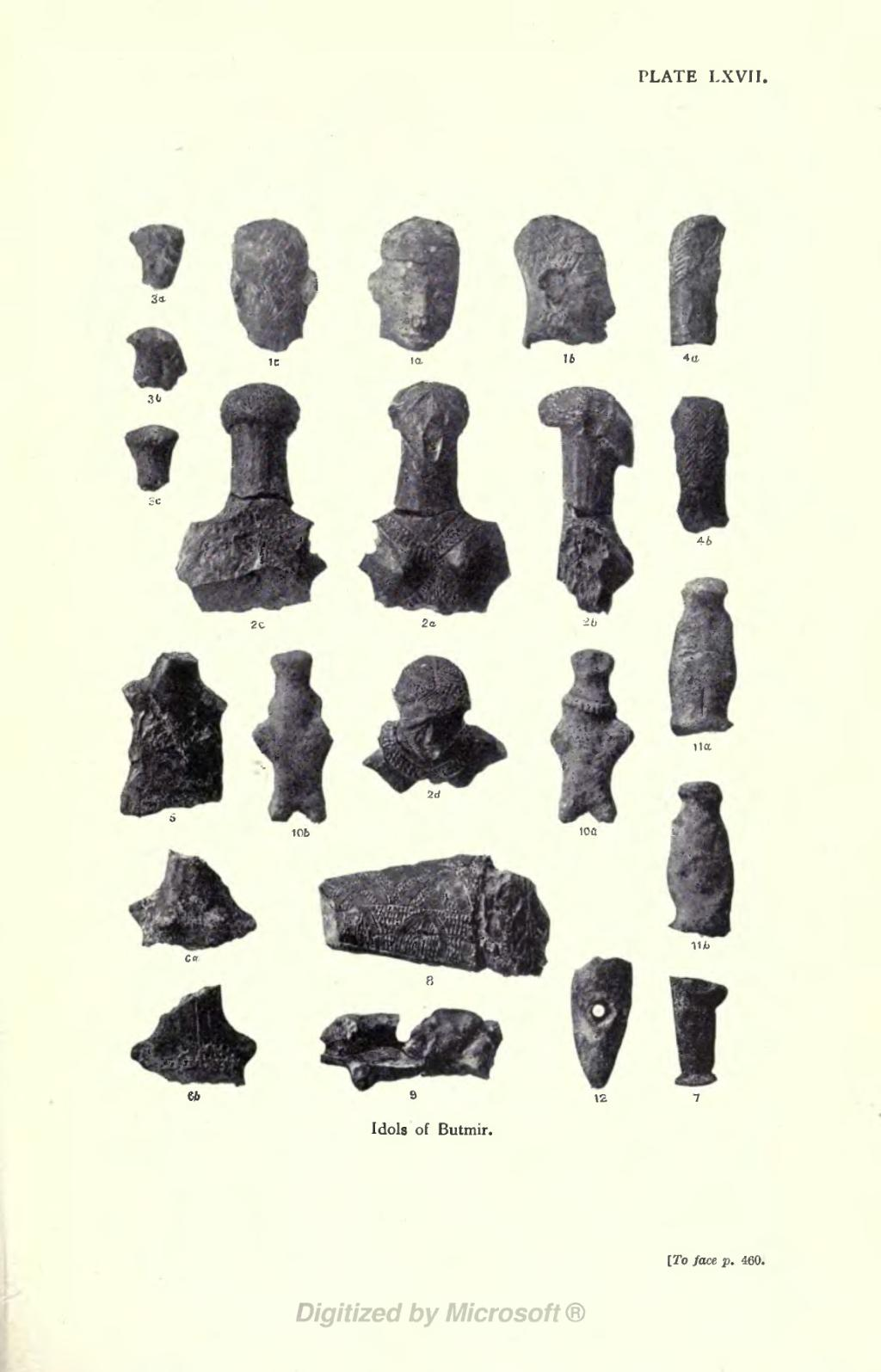
Clay sculptures

== See also ==
- Bronze Age
- Vinča culture

== Sources ==
- H. Rudolf, Landscapes and Human Development: The Contribution of European Archaeology. 2010. 182–190.
- W. Radymský / M. Hoernes, Die neolithische Station von Butmir bei Sarajevo in Bosnien. Ausgrabungen im Jahre 1893 (Wien 1895).
- F. Fiala / M. Hoernes, Die neolithische Station von Butmir bei Sarajevo in Bosnien. Ausgrabungen in den Jahren 1894–1896. II. Teil (Schlussband) (Wien 1898).
- A. Benac, Obre II – Neolitsko naselje butmirske grupe na Gornjem polju. Glasnik 26, 1971, 5–300.
- M. Gimbutas, Chronology of Obre I an Obre II. Wiss. Mitt. Bosnisch-Herzegowin. Landesmus. 4, 1974, 15–35.
- S. Peric, Butmirska kultura. Geneza i razvoj. Butmir culture. Origin and development. Posebna Izdanja Arheoloski Institut (Beograd 1995).
- Z. Kujundžić-Vejzagić / J. Müller / K. Rassmann / T. Schüler, Okolište – Grabung und Geomagnetik eines zentralbosnischen Tells aus der ersten Hälfte des 5. vorchristlichen Jahrtausends. In: B. Hänsel (Hrsg.), Parerga Praehistorica: Jubiläumsschrift zur Prähistorischen Archäologie. 15 Jahre UPA. Universitätsforsch. Prähist. Arch. 100 (Bonn 2004) 69–81.
