= Cardial =

The term cardial may refer to:

- cardial or cardiac, pertaining to the heart (Ancient Greek καρδιά, kardiá, "heart")
- Cardial Ware, a Neolithic decorative style
