= La Hoguette =

- Commune
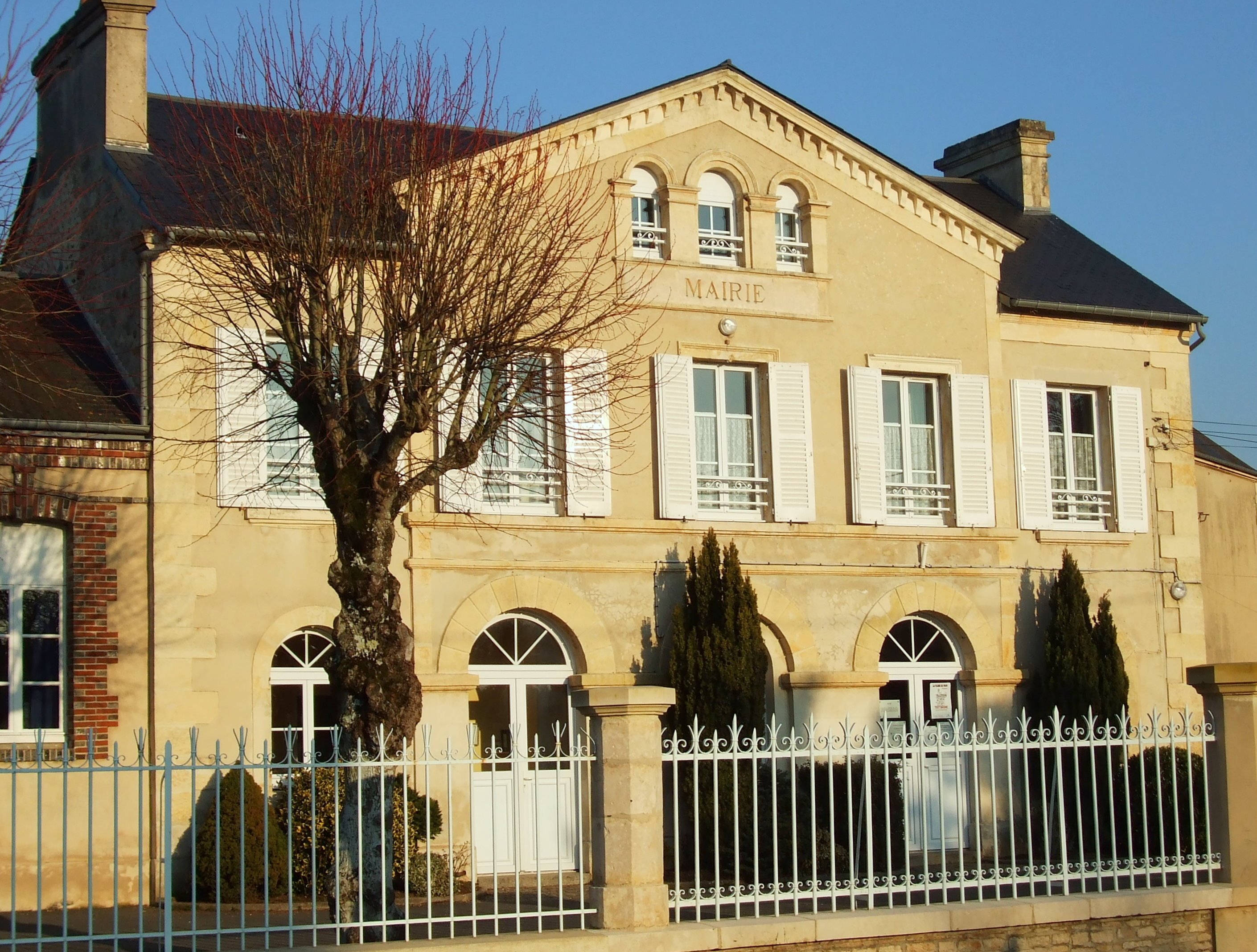
- Town hall

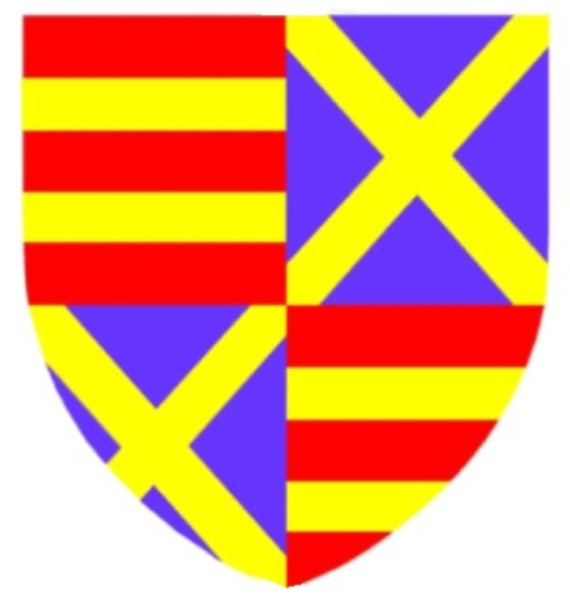
- Coat of arms
- Location of La Hoguette
- Location within France Location within Normandy
- Coordinates: 48°52′42″N 0°09′32″W
- Country: France
- Region: Normandy
- Department: Calvados
- Arrondissement: Caen
- Canton: Falaise
- Intercommunality: Pays de Falaise

Government
  - Mayor (2020–2026): Sylvie Grenier
- Area^{1}: 24.44 km^{2} (9.44 sq mi)
- Elevation: 220 m (720 ft)
- Highest elevation: 267 m (876 ft)
- Lowest elevation: 89 m (292 ft)
- Population (2023): 662
  - Density: 27.1/km^{2} (70.2/sq mi)
- Time zone: UTC+01:00 (CET)
  - Summer (DST): UTC+02:00 (CEST)
- INSEE/Postal code: 14332 /14700
- ^{1} French Land Register data, which excludes lakes, ponds, glaciers > 1 km^{2} (0.386 sq mi or 247 acres) and river estuaries.

La Hoguette (French pronunciation: [la ɔɡɛt]) is a commune in the Calvados department in the Normandy region in northwestern France.

== Geography ==
Five rivers run through the commune the Filaine, Gronde, Traine-feuilles, Trainefeuille and Bilaine.

The commune borders the Orne department.

The Commune has an area of woods known as Saint-André.

== Archeology ==
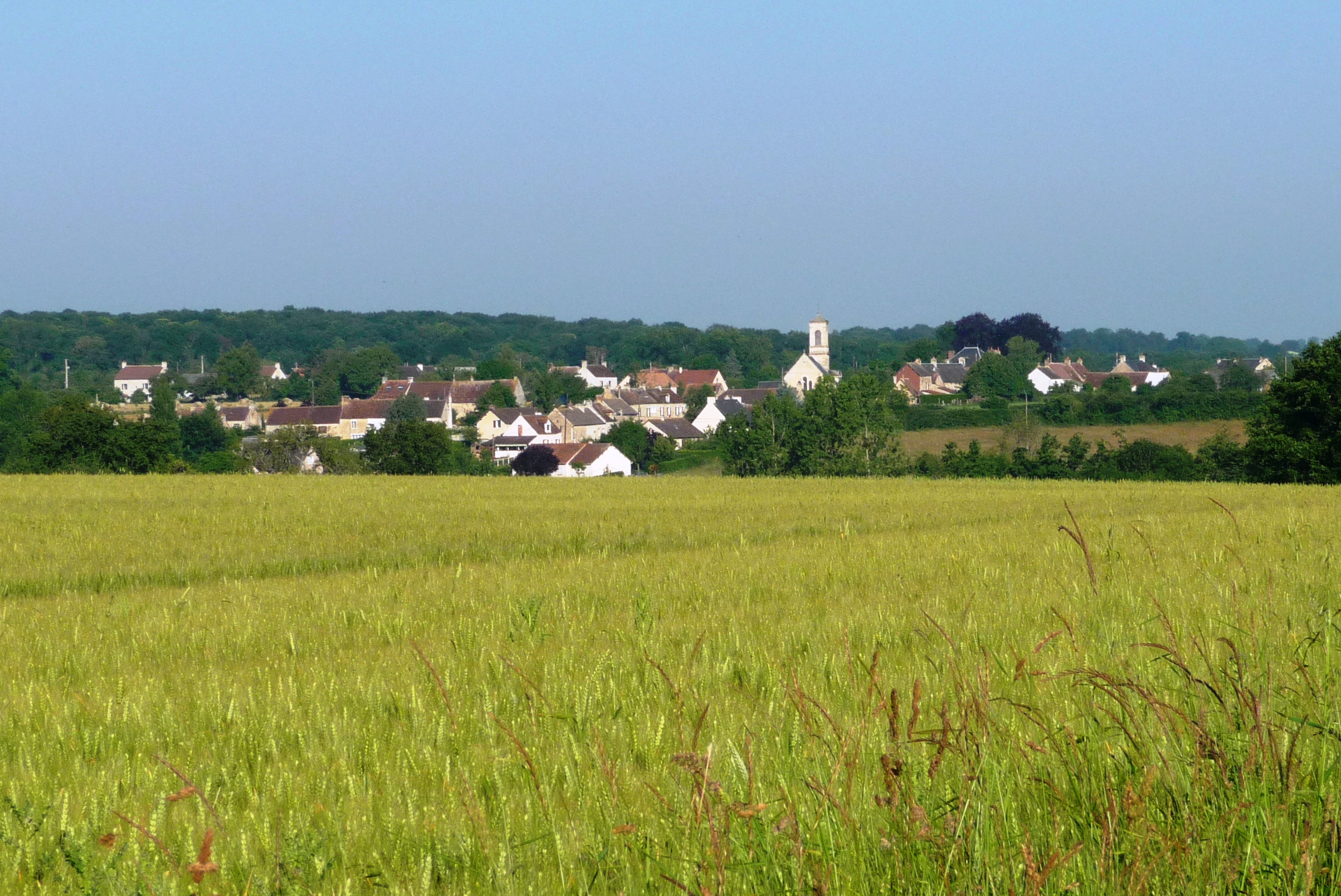

La Hoguette is also the type site of the early Neolithic La Hoguette culture that is found mainly in association with Linear pottery (Linearbandkeramic) or Limburg pottery in Northern France, The Netherlands, Alsace and Western Germany. It is believed to ultimately derive from the Mediterranean Cardial culture traditions. Important sites of the La-Hoguette culture include Stuttgart-Wilhelma, Dautenheim and Godelau.

The La Hoguette pottery was found under a later megalithic tomb and first misidentified as Linearbandkeramic. La Hoguette marks the westernmost point of the distribution of this culture. The place name La Hoguette is believed to derive from the Old Norse word Haugr meaning a knoll or a hill.

== Population ==
Historical population
| Year | Pop. | ±% p.a. |
|---|---|---|
| 1968 | 464 | — |
| 1975 | 436 | −0.89% |
| 1982 | 485 | +1.53% |
| 1990 | 532 | +1.16% |
| 1999 | 573 | +0.83% |
| 2007 | 633 | +1.25% |
| 2012 | 694 | +1.86% |
| 2017 | 714 | +0.57% |
| 2023 | 662 | −1.25% |
Source: INSEE

== Places of interest ==
Abbaye de Saint-André-de-Gouffern is the remains of a 12th century Abbey built in 1127 and is classed as a Monument historique

== Personalities ==
La Hoguette was the birthplace of Georges Marchais (1920–1997), head of the French Communist Party.

== See also ==
- Communes of the Calvados department
