= Stentinello culture =

Neolithic culture in Sicily and Calabria

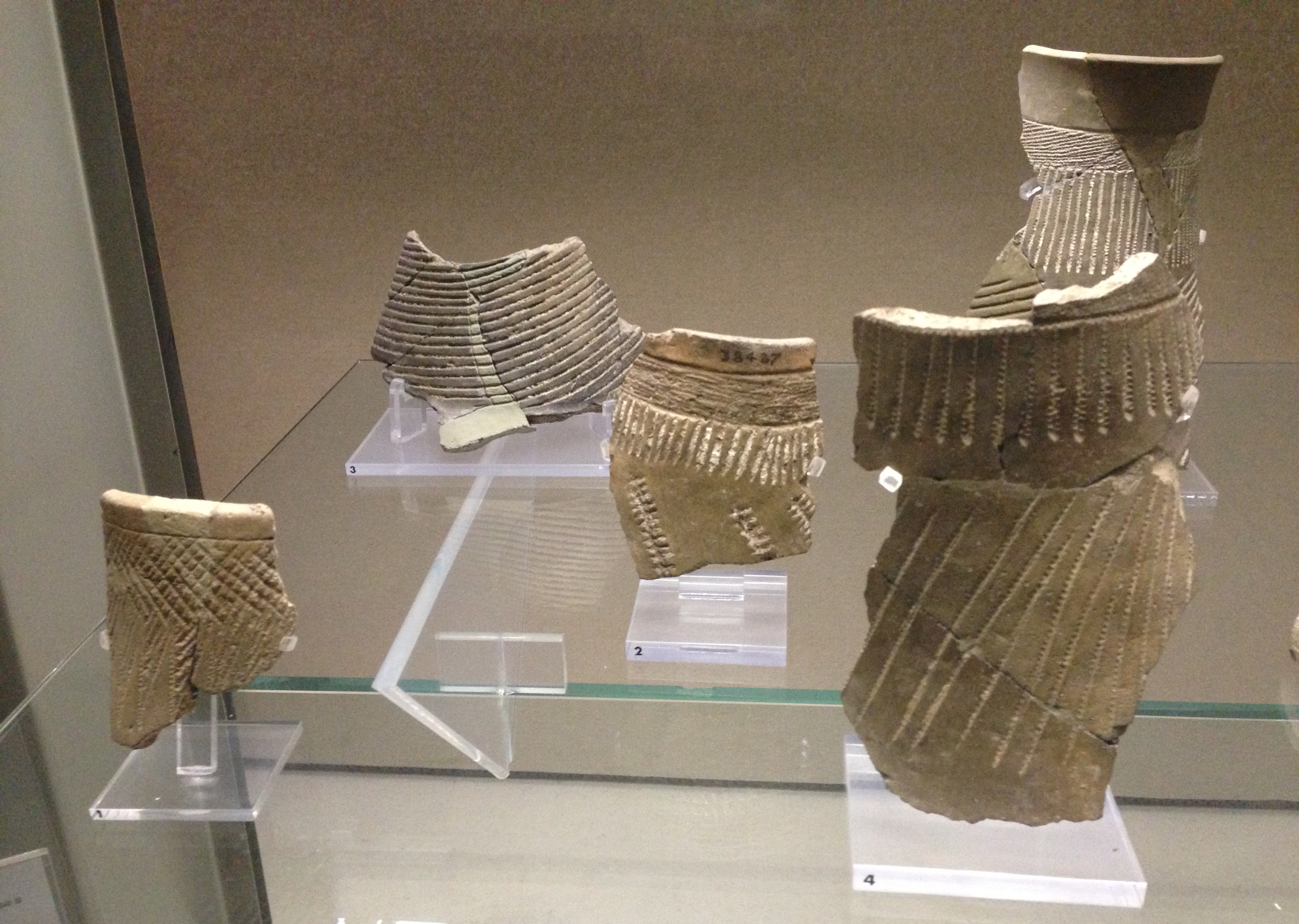
- Geographical range: Sicily and Calabria
- Period: Early Neolithic
- Dates: c. 6000 BC – 4000 BC
- Preceded by: Impressed Ware culture
- Followed by: Cantignano culture

Stentinello culture was a middle Neolithic culture, widespread in Sicily and Calabria, dated to the fifth millennium BC. Under different names this culture is also present in the Aeolian islands (Castellaro Vecchio culture) and Malta (Għar Dalam phase). The Kronio culture, a variant of that of Stentinello, was widespread in western Sicily.

In the eponymous site were found the remains of buildings with rectangular plan enclosed in a ditch dug in the rock forming an oval space of about 180 x 200 meters. The burials of this culture, found in various places in Sicily, but not in Stentinello, were oval pit carved into the rock in which the deceased lie buried in a crouched position. The material culture includes lithic industry of flint and obsidian, industry of bone (awls, needles, spatulas) and ceramics. The vases, black, or dark in color, are almost always decorated with intricate geometric, or, more rarely, anthropomorphic, patterns etched or engraved. The economy was based on the cultivation of cereals, particularly wheat and barley, on fishing and shellfish harvesting.

== Bibliography ==
- Luigi Bernabò Brea, La Sicilia prima dei Greci, Il Saggiatore, Milano, 1958.
- Paolo Orsi (1890). Stazione neolitica di Stentinello.
- Istituto italiano di preistoria e protostoria (2004). Atti della XXXVII Riunione scientifica: preistoria e protostoria della Calabria : Scalea, Papasidero, Praia a Mare, Tortora, 29 settembre-4 ottobre 2002, Volume 1.
- S Tinè (1961). Notizie preliminari su recenti scavi nel villaggio neolitico di Stentinello. Archivio Storico Siracusano.
