= Danilo, Croatia =

Settlement in Šibenik-Knin County, Croatia

Danilo
- Settlement
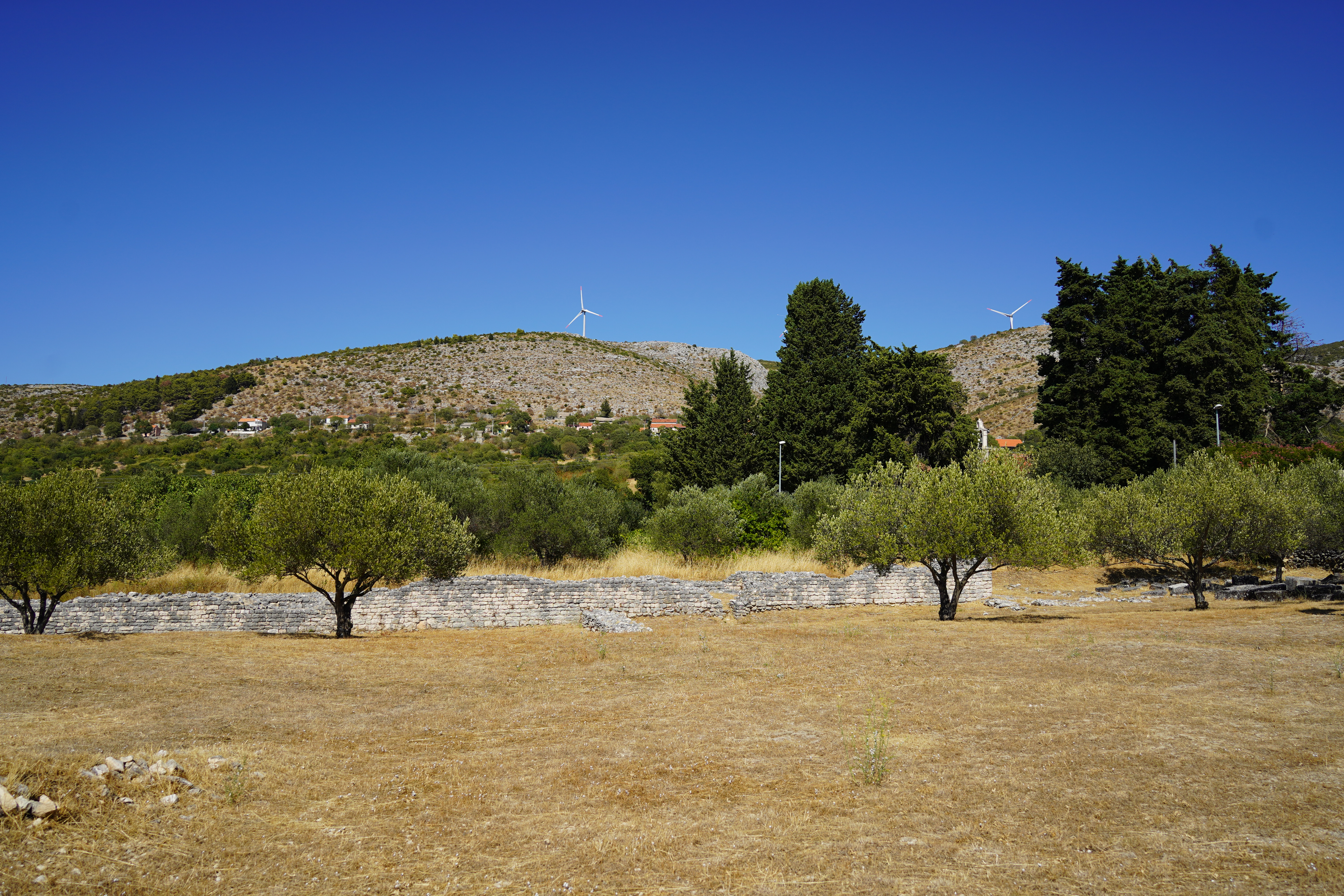
- Ruins of a Roman villa
- Interactive map of Danilo
- Location of Danilo in Croatia
- Coordinates: 43°42′23″N 16°02′00″E
- Country: Croatia
- County: Šibenik-Knin
- City: Šibenik

Area
  - Total: 18.8 km^{2} (7.3 sq mi)

Population (2021)
  - Total: 319
  - Density: 17.0/km^{2} (43.9/sq mi)
- Time zone: UTC+1 (CET)
  - Summer (DST): UTC+2 (CEST)
- Postal code: 22000 Šibenik
- Area code: +385 (0)22

Danilo is a village within the area of the City of Šibenik in Croatia. In 2021, its population was 319.

== History ==
The oldest archaeological sites date back to the Neolithic period when the Danilo culture (4500-3900 BC) emerged in the Danilo polje, a fertile oval valley between two karst ridges cultivated for millennia due to its quality soil. Its scarce water sources were historically crucial for inhabitants: the clayey impermeable soil allows water to be retained in the lower layers of the earth, and even today, at the foot of the hill, there is a large and inexhaustible pond called Munjača. From the Danilo culture era, beautifully shaped ceramic vessels (rhyton – a decorated vessel on four legs with a large carrying handle) with geometric decorations have been found.

Metal Age settlers, Illyrians, controlled the polje from the Gradina fort on the imposing hill above the present-day hamlet of Danilo Gornji. Romans established the municipium Rider, exploiting local resources. Their settlement continued the ancient traffic function of the former Illyrian hillfort Rider throughout antiquity.

During the Great Migrations, Croats settled, continuing agriculture and transhumance. In the Middle Ages, the Šibenik Commune utilized the polje for cultivating vineyards, olives, and cereals. The Ottoman period brought instability due to nearby strongholds, but after the early 18th century, peace allowed for resettlement. Traditional crop production has remained the area's primary characteristic up to the present day.

== Demographics ==
Danilo: Population trends 1857–2021
v

population	432	472	435	316	405	580	920	1084	789	849	838	770	622	508	417	376	319
	1857	1869	1880	1890	1900	1910	1921	1931	1948	1953	1961	1971	1981	1991	2001	2011	2021

Sources: Croatian Bureau of Statistics publications
