= Lisičići =

Lisičići Лисичићи
- Village
- Location within Bosnia and Herzegovina
- Coordinates: 43°42′N 17°53′E
- Country: Bosnia and Herzegovina
- Entity: Federation of Bosnia and Herzegovina
- Canton: Herzegovina-Neretva
- Municipality: Konjic

Area
  - Total: 0.47 sq mi (1.21 km^{2})

Population (2013)
  - Total: 192
  - Density: 411/sq mi (159/km^{2})
- Time zone: UTC+1 (CET)
  - Summer (DST): UTC+2 (CEST)

Lisičići (Cyrillic: Лисичићи) is a village in the municipality of Konjic, Bosnia and Herzegovina.

== Demographics ==
According to the 2013 census, its population was 192.

Ethnicity in 2013
Ethnicity	Number	Percentage
Bosniaks	191	99.5%
other/undeclared	1	0.5%
Total	192	100%
