= Cardium pottery =

Archaeological culture

Cardium pottery culture
- Geographical range: Southern Europe, Near East, North Africa
- Period: Neolithic
- Dates: c. 6400 BC – c. 5500 BC
- Major sites: Liguria, Sardinia, Coppa Nevigata
- Preceded by: Neolithic Greece, Starčevo culture, Mesolithic Europe,
- Followed by: Danilo culture, Kakanj culture, Stentinello culture, Neolithic Italy, Neolithic Malta, Neolithic Sardinia, Neolithic France, Neolithic Iberia, La Hoguette culture

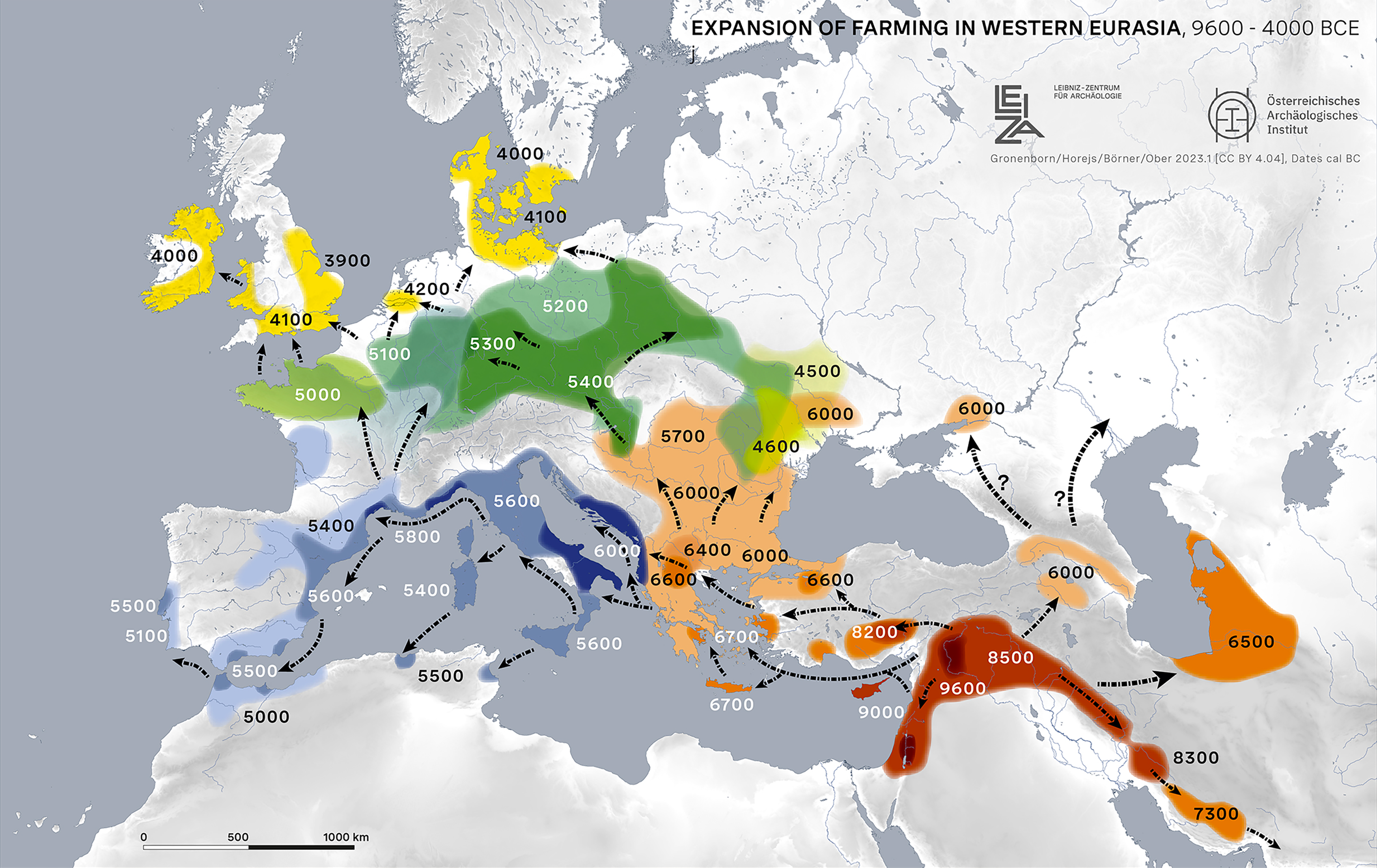
Neolithic expansions from the 10th to the 5th millennium BC, including the Cardium culture in blue

Cardium pottery or Cardial ware is a Neolithic decorative style that gets its name from the imprinting of the clay with the heart-shaped shell of the Cerastoderma glaucum, a member of the cockle family Cardiidae. These forms of pottery are in turn used to define the Neolithic culture which produced and spread them, commonly called the "Cardial culture".

The alternative name, impressed ware, is given by some archaeologists to define this culture, because impressions can be made with sharp objects other than cockle shells, such as a nail or comb. Impressed pottery is much more widespread than the Cardial. Impressed ware is found in the zone "covering Italy to the Ligurian coast" as distinct from the more western Cardial extending from Provence to western Portugal. The sequence in prehistoric Europe has traditionally been supposed to start with widespread Cardial ware, and then to develop other methods of impression locally, termed "epi-Cardial". However the widespread Cardial and Impressed pattern types overlap and are now considered more likely to be contemporary.

== The Mediterranean Neolithic ==
This pottery style gives its name to the main culture of the Mediterranean Neolithic: Cardium pottery culture or Cardial culture, or impressed ware culture, which eventually extended from the Adriatic sea to the Atlantic coasts of Portugal and south to Morocco.

The earliest impressed ware sites, dating to 6400–6200 BC, are in Epirus and Corfu. Settlements then appear in Albania and Dalmatia on the eastern Adriatic coast dating to between 6100 and 5900 BC. The earliest date in Italy comes from Coppa Nevigata on the Adriatic coast of southern Italy, perhaps as early as 6000 cal B.C. Also during Su Carroppu culture in Sardinia, already in its early stages (low strata into Su Coloru cave, c. 6000 BC) early examples of cardial pottery appear. Northward and westward all secure radiocarbon dates are identical to those for Iberia c. 5500 cal BC, which indicates a rapid spread of Cardial and related cultures: 2,000 km from the gulf of Genoa to the estuary of the Mondego in probably no more than 100–200 years. This suggests a seafaring expansion by planting colonies along the coast.

Older Neolithic cultures existed already at this time in eastern Greece and Crete, apparently having arrived from Anatolia, but they appear distinct from the Cardial or impressed ware culture. The ceramic tradition in the central Balkans also remained distinct from that along the Adriatic coastline in both style and manufacturing techniques for almost 1,000 years from the 6th millennium BC. Early Neolithic impressed pottery is found in the Levant, and certain parts of Anatolia, including Mezraa-Teleilat, and in North Africa at Tunus-Redeyef, Tunisia. Impressed pottery also appears in Egypt. Along the East Mediterranean coast impressed ware has been found in North Syria, Palestine and Lebanon.

== Gallery ==
Map of Italy showing important sites that were occupied in the Cardium culture (clickable map)
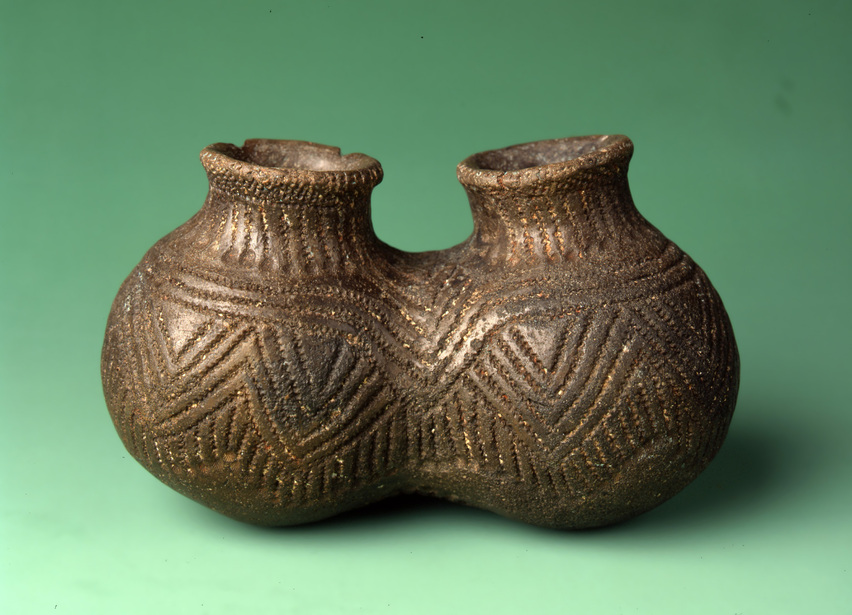

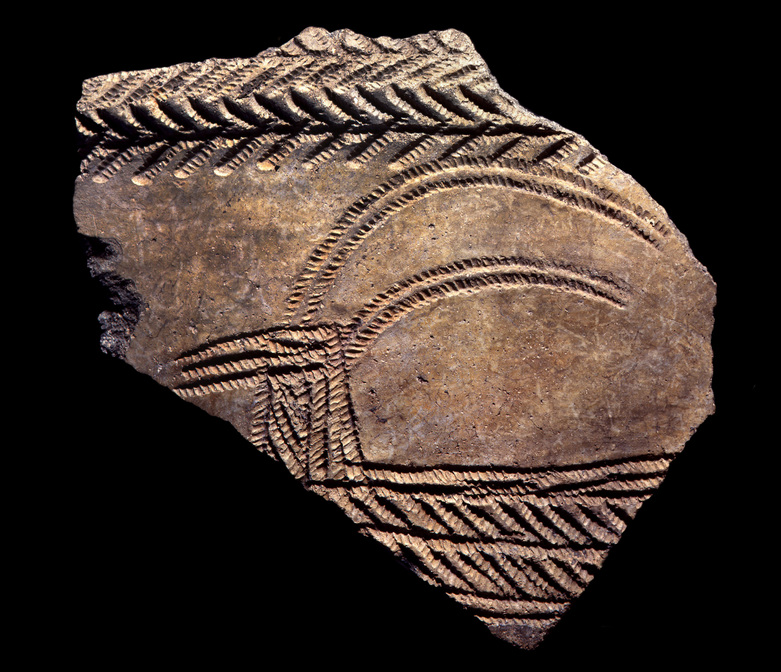

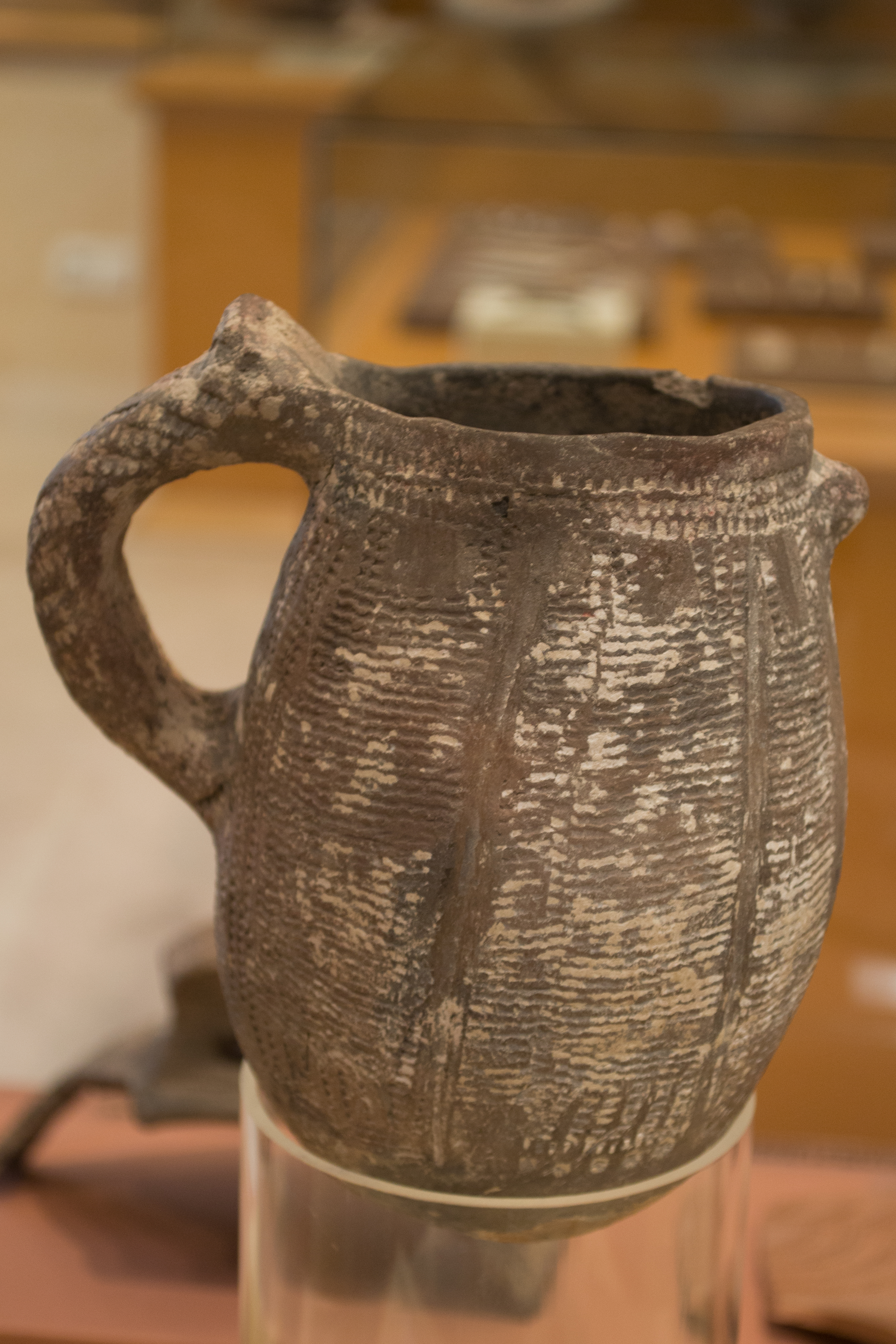

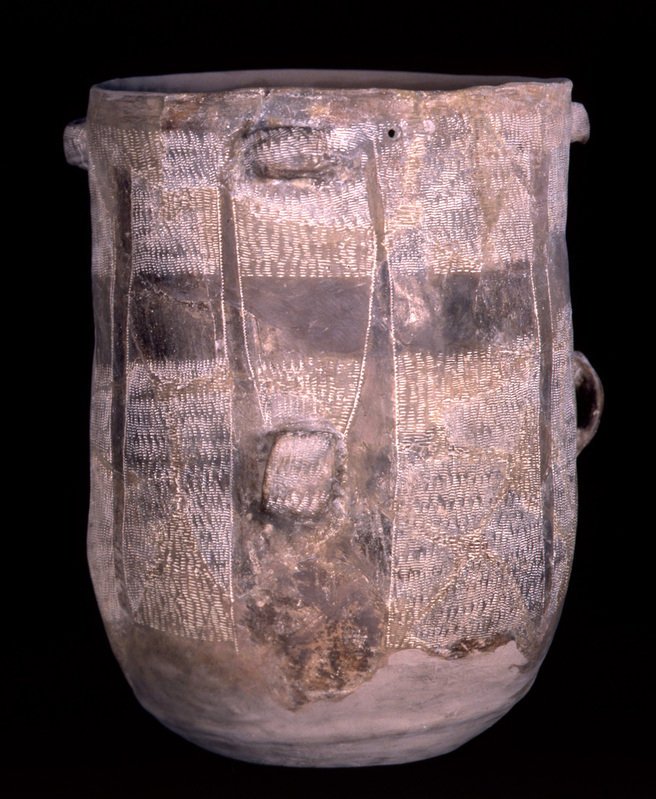

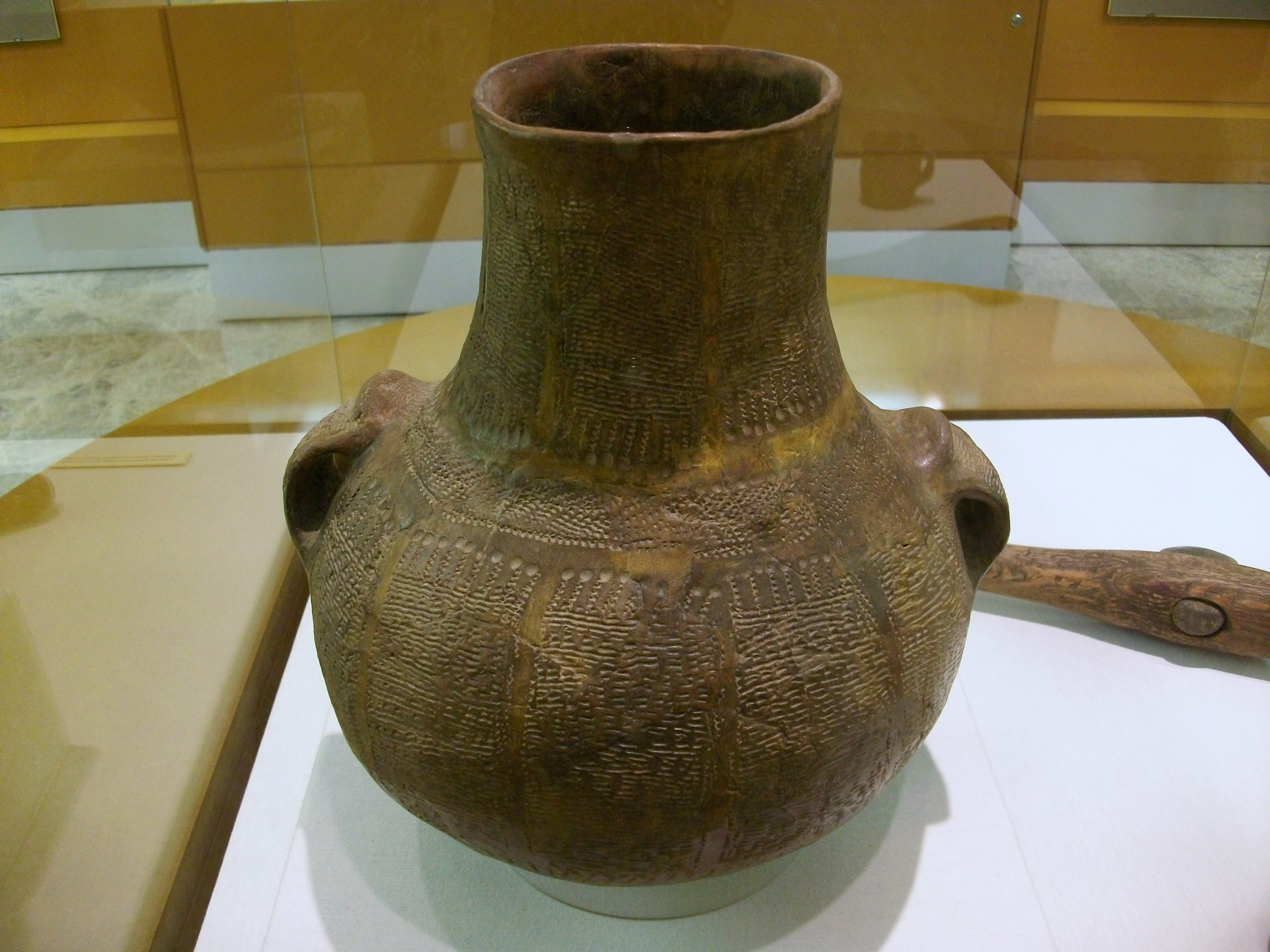

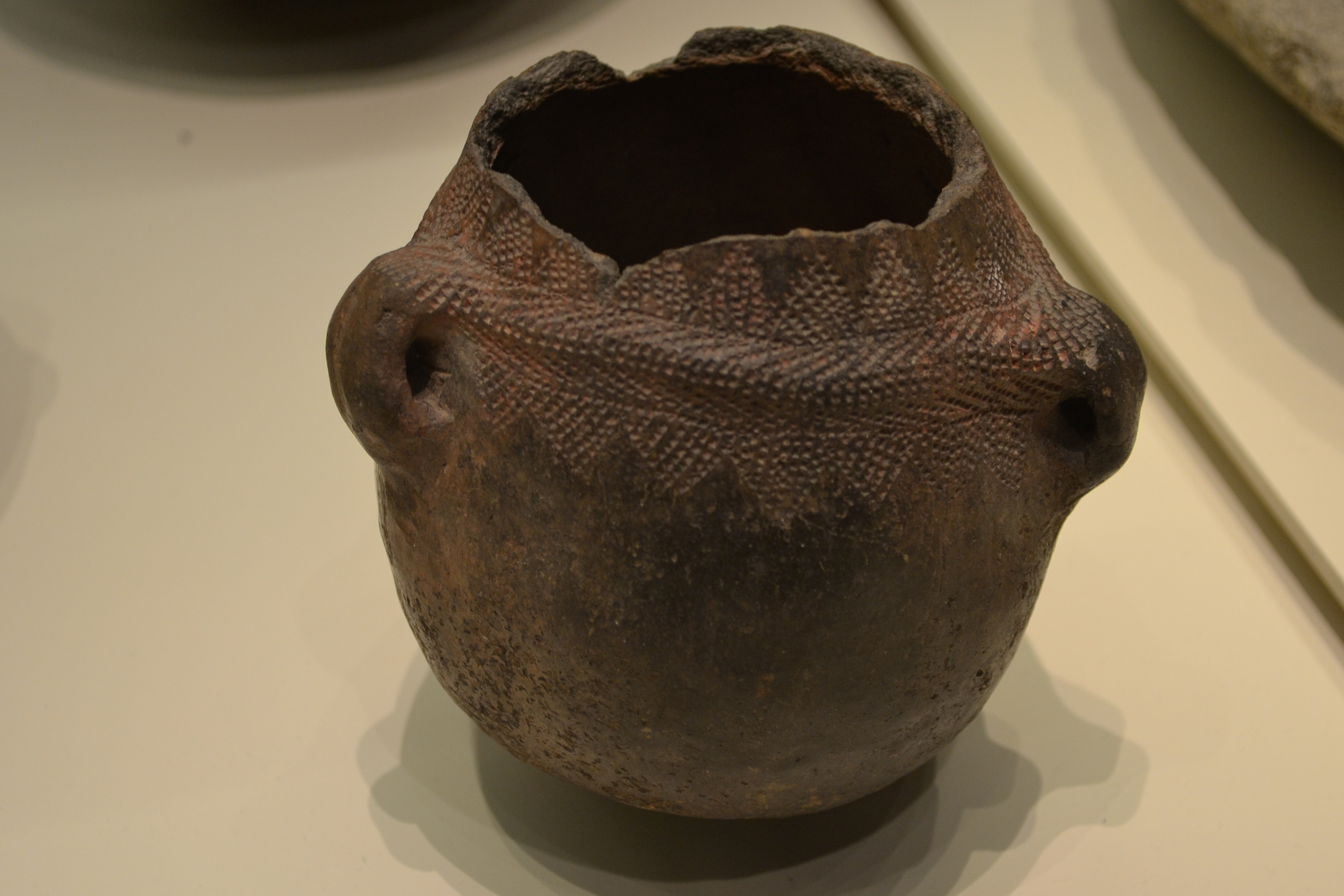

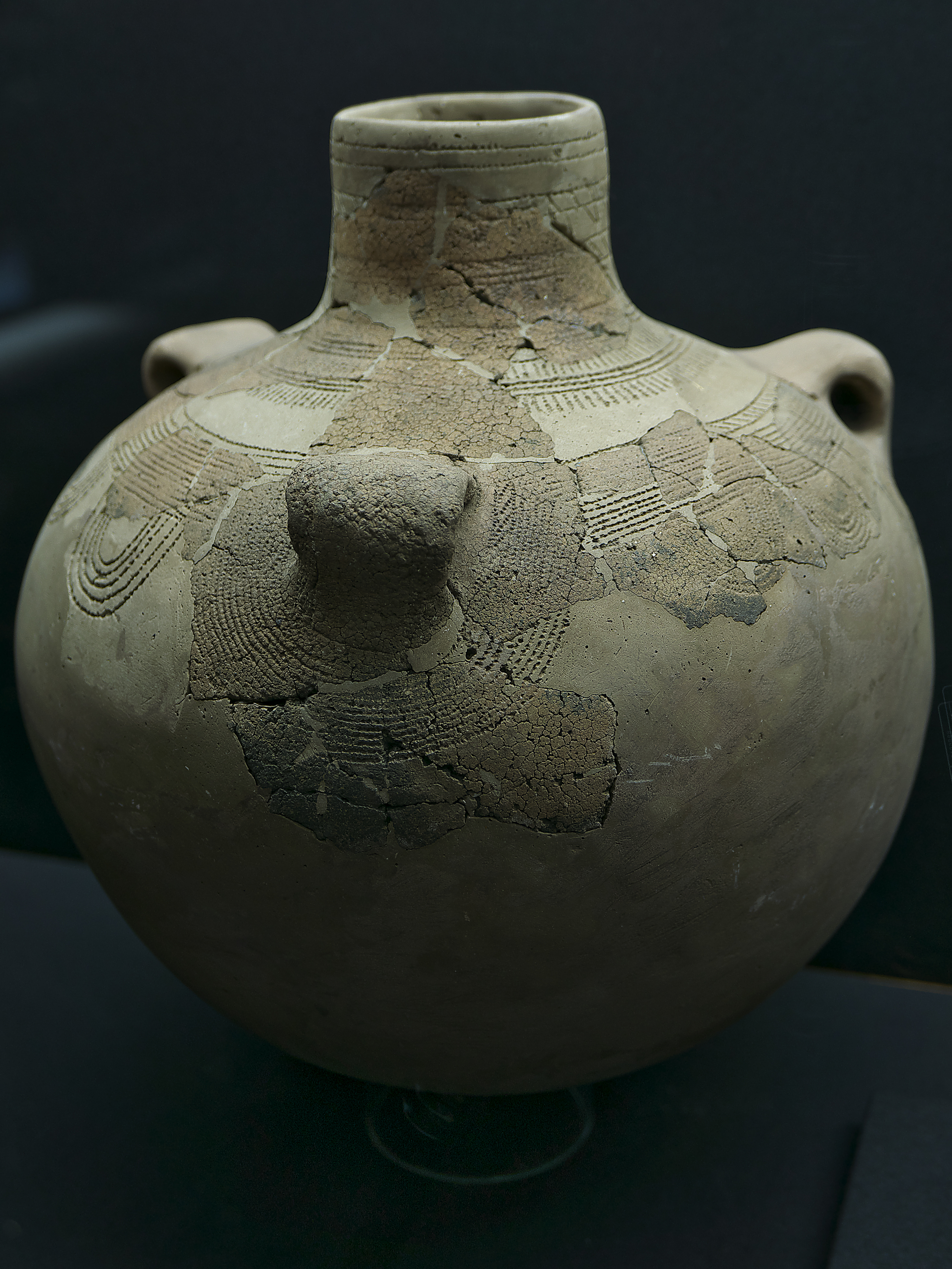

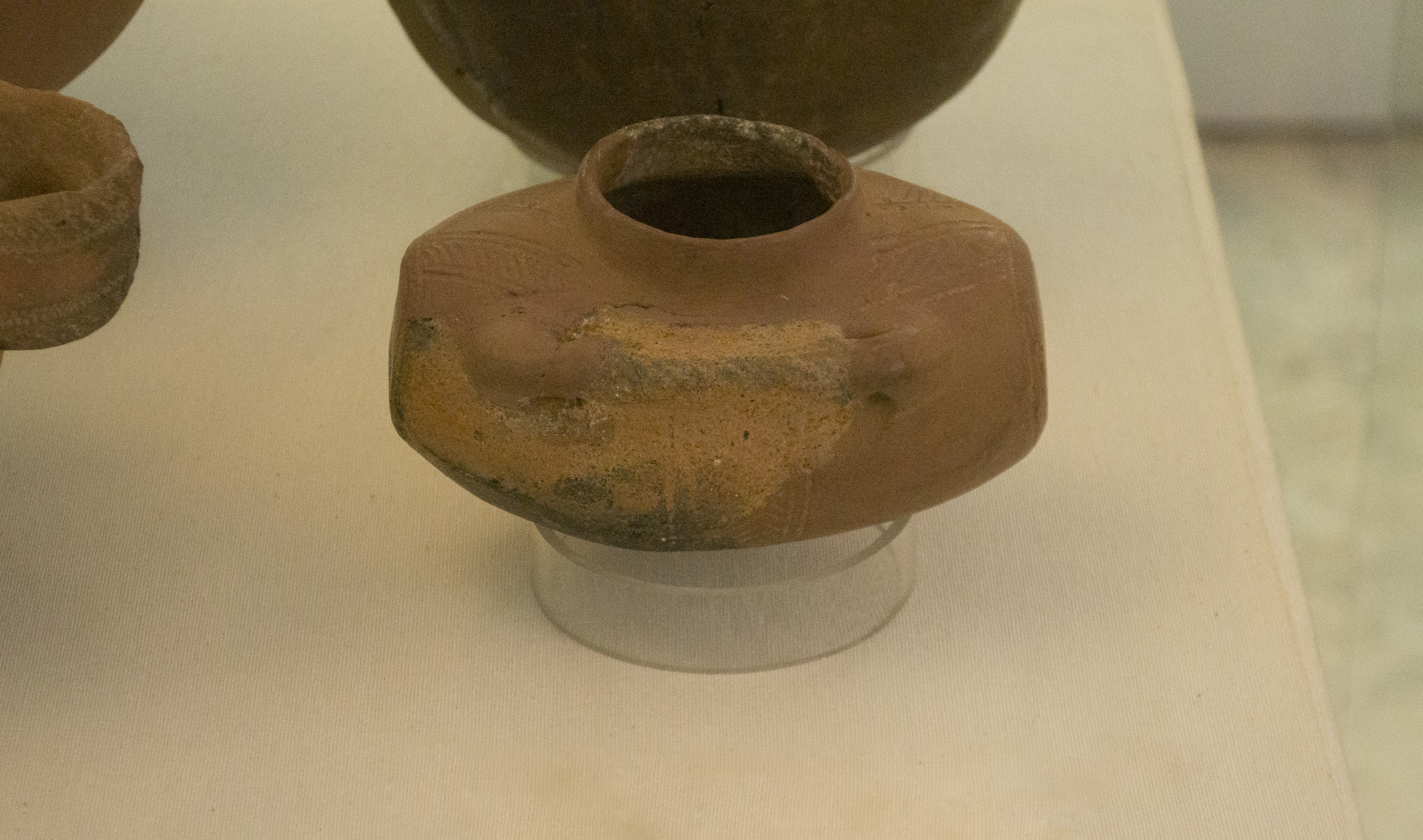

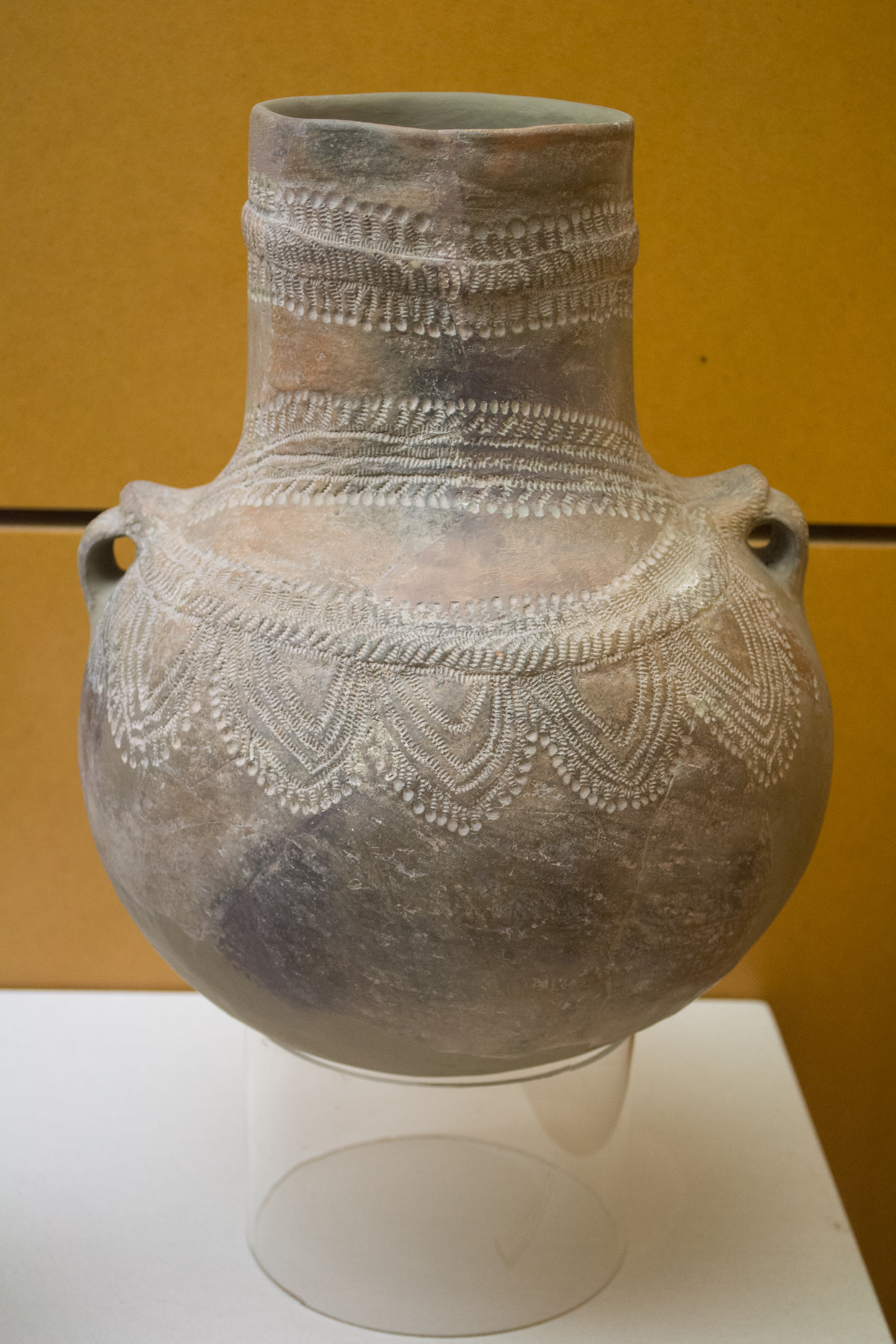

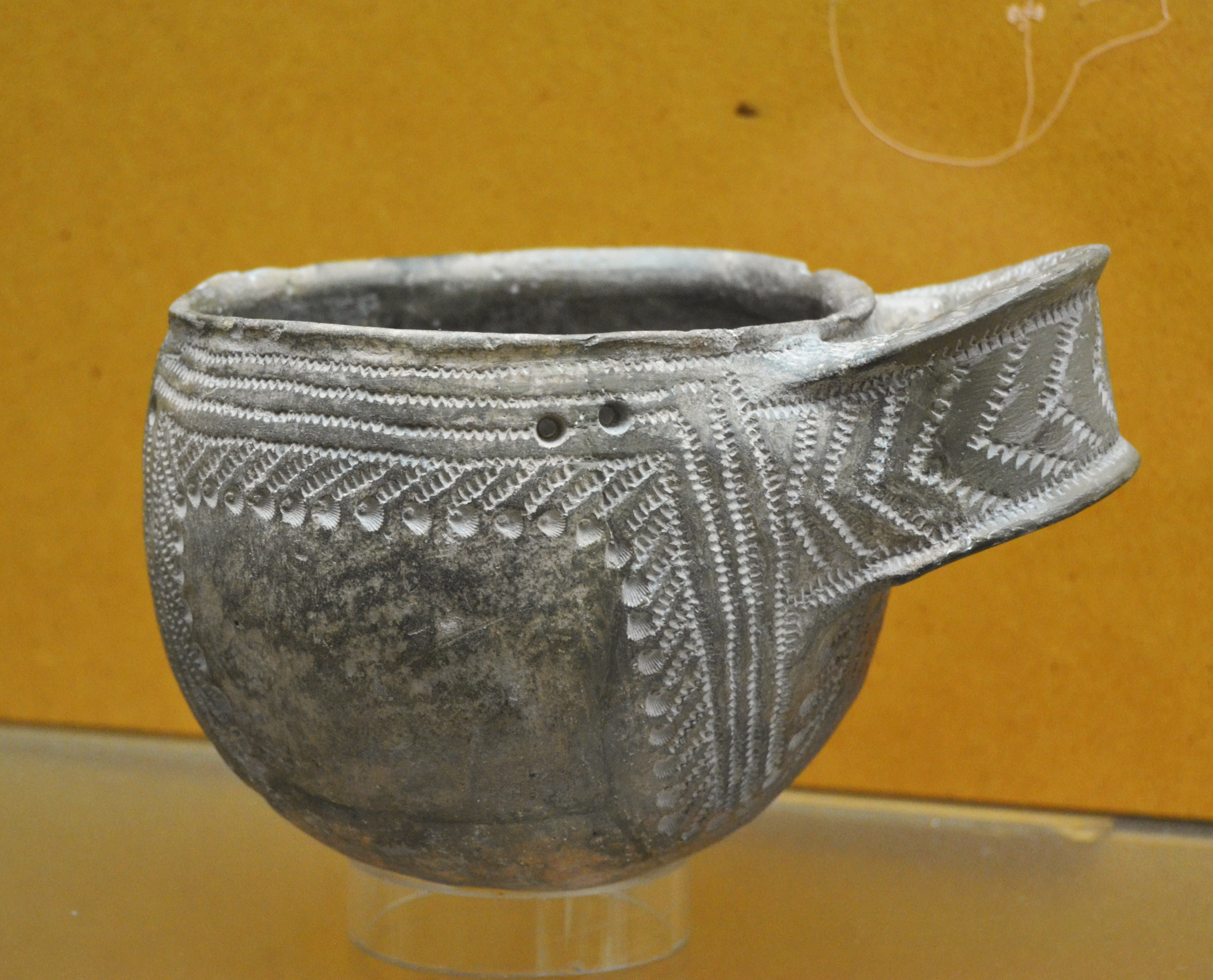

== Genetics ==
Olalde et al. 2015 examined the remains of 6 Cardials buried in Spain c. 5470–5220 BC. The 6 samples of mtDNA extracted belonged to the maternal haplogroups K1a2a, X2c, H4a1a (2 samples), H3 and K1a4a1. The authors of the study suggested that the Cardials and peoples of the Linear Pottery Culture were descended from a common farming population in the Balkans, which had subsequently migrated further westwards into Europe along the Mediterranean coast and Danube river respectively. Among modern populations, the Cardials were found to be most closely related to Sardinians and Basque people. The Iberian Cardials carried a noticeable amount of hunter-gatherer ancestry. This hunter-gatherer ancestry was more similar to that of Eastern Hunter-Gatherers (EHGs) than Iberian hunter-gatherers, and appeared to have been acquired before the Cardial expansion into Iberia.

Fernández et al. 2014 found traces of maternal genetic affinity between people of the Linear Pottery Culture and Cardium pottery with earlier peoples of the Near Eastern Pre-Pottery Neolithic B, including the rare mtDNA (maternal) basal haplogroup N*, and suggested that Neolithic period was initiated by seafaring colonists from the Near East.

Mathieson et al. 2018 examined three Cardials buried at the Zemunica Cave near Bisko in modern-day Croatia c. 5800 BC. The two samples of Y-DNA extracted belonged to the paternal haplogroups C1a2 and E1b1b1a1b1, while the three samples of mtDNA extracted belonged to the maternal haplogroups H1, K1b1a and N1a1. The team further examined two Cardials buried at Kargadur in modern-day Croatia c. 5600 BC. The one male carried the paternal haplogroup G2a2a1, and the maternal haplogroup H7c, the female carried H5a. All three belonged to the Early European Farmer (EEF) cluster, thus being closely related to earlier Neolithic populations of north-west Anatolia, of the Balkan Neolithic, contemporary peoples of the Central European Linear Pottery culture, and later peoples of the Cardial Ware culture in Iberia. This would suggest that the Cardial Ware people and the Linear Pottery people were derived from a single migration from Anatolia into the Balkans, which then split into two and expanded northward and westward further into Europe.

Five individuals buried in two sites linked to Impressa ware were tested genetically (Grotta Continenza in Trasacco, and Ripabianca di Monterado in Ancona), the males had Y-chromosomes G-L91 (G2a2a1a2), R-M343 (R1b), J-L26 (J2a1) and J-M304 (J*). These Neolithic individuals could be modeled as a mixture of ~5% Western hunter-gatherer and ~95% Anatolian farmers (who carried an additional Caucasian HG ancestry).

Five herders with Cardium pottery were buried in a cave of the Aragonese Pre-Pyrenees (Cueva de Chaves, Bastarás, Huesca province), the genetic analysis found that the Y-haplogroup of two males was I2a1b, being the other male assigned to R1b-M343. Admixture models found that their ancestry was 4/5 Anatolian-like and 1/5 Villabruna-like.

The remains of three transhumant herders found in Cova dels Trocs (Sant Feliu de Veri, Bisaurri, in the Spanish Pyrenees) were analyzed, the Y-chomosomes were: R1b1, F*. and I2a1a.

Three individuals buried in the Pendimoun rock-shelter (Castellar, Alpes-Maritimes) were tested genetically, the male individual carried Y-haplogroup I-M423 (I2a1a2b).

Two individuals from the Cardial cave Gruta do Caldeirão (municipality of Tomar, in central Portugal) were assigned to Y-chromosome haplogroup I2a1a.

Four individuals from the Kaf Taht el-Ghar site (a cave near Tétouan, in the Rif) were analyzed, the only Y-haplogroup found in the two males was G2a (subclade G2a2b2a1a1c1a); the autosomal components of the buried were Anatolian Neolithic ancestry (72%), Western Hunter-Gatherer ancestry (10%) and local Maghrebi ancestry (18%).

The late-Neolithic Kehf el Baroud inhabitants in present-day Morocco (c. 3700 BC) were modelled as being of about 50% local North African ancestry and 50% Early European Farmer (EEF) ancestry. It was suggested that EEF ancestry had entered North Africa through Cardial Ware colonists from Iberia sometime between 5000 and 3700 BC. They were found to be closely related to the Guanches of the Canary Islands. The authors of the study suggested that the Berbers of Morocco carried a substantial amount of EEF ancestry before the establishment of Roman colonies in Berber Africa. According to Simões (2023) human remains from the earliest Neolithic contexts in northwestern Africa had European Neolithic ancestry (c. 5400 BC), indicating that the first stages of the Neolithisation process in northwestern Africa were started by the migration of Neolithic farmers from Iberia. The earliest pottery in the Tingitan peninsula (the African portion of the Gibraltar Strait) was also of Cardial type, with clear affinities to archaic Cardial pottery from Catalonia–Valencia.

Y-DNA recopilatory table
C1a	E1b	G2a	I2a	J2a	R1b
1	1	4	5	2	3

== See also ==
- Prehistoric Italy
- Prehistoric France
- Prehistoric Iberia
- Byblos
- Prehistory of Corsica
- La Marmotta Neolithic settlement

== Sources ==
- Mathieson, Iain; et al. (21 February 2018). "The genomic history of southeastern Europe". Nature. 555 (7695). Nature Research: 197–203. Bibcode:2018Natur.555..197M. doi:10.1038/nature25778. PMC 6091220. PMID 29466330.
- Olalde, Iñigo; et al. (2 September 2015). "A Common Genetic Origin for Early Farmers from Mediterranean Cardial and Central European LBK Cultures". PLOS Genetics. 32 (12). PLOS: 3132–3142. doi:10.1093/molbev/msv181. PMC 4652622. PMID 26337550.
- Fernández, Eva; et al. (5 June 2014). "Ancient DNA Analysis of 8000 B.C. Near Eastern Farmers Supports an Early Neolithic Pioneer Maritime Colonization of Mainland Europe through Cyprus and the Aegean Islands". PLOS Genetics. 10 (6) e1004401. PLOS. doi:10.1371/journal.pgen.1004401. PMC 4046922. PMID 24901650.
