= Kakanj culture =

Early Neolithic culture in Central Bosnia

- Geographical range: Central Bosnia
- Period: Neolithic Europe
- Dates: 6795 BCE – c. 4900 BCE
- Major sites: Kakanj - Obre, Obre II, Papratnica, Plandište; Visoko - Arnautovići, Okolište; Zavidovići - Tuk
- Preceded by: local Mesolithic forager groups
- Followed by: Butmir culture Starčevo culture

Kakanj culture was a Neolithic culture of Old Europe. It appeared in Central Bosnia's town of Kakanj and covered periods dated from 6795–4900 BCE.

== History ==
Central Bosnia and areas in Sarajevo, Visoko, and Zenica basins were the main areas of first prehistoric populations in Europe, especially along the shores of the Bosna river.

Central Bosnia was later populated by other cultures, like the Starčevo. They are all based in a unique culture that is known as the Kakanj culture, as the first findings were at a site in the Obre settlement of Kakanj.

Other known locations of the European original culture are sited at: Kakanj – Plandište, Papratnica; Visoko – Arnautovići, Okolište, and Tuk near Zavidovići. The Kakanj culture had strong influence on the development of the Butmir culture.

In what is now an obsolete view, Marija Gimbutas regarded the Kakanj culture as a local variant of the Starčevo, with elements of the Danilo group.

== Settlements and artifacts ==
The excavated settlements were not uniform. The site in Obre included rectangular houses with 1 or 2 rooms, with foundations made of stone and clay loam walls. Stone tools were predominant, especially molded hatchets. Tools like spatulas and needles were made out of bones.

The pottery was versatile, coarse, and monochrome. The surface of the monochrome ceramics was well polished, as is in Butmir culture.

The shapes included vessels with tall hollow conical stems, alongside bowls with thicker rims and 4-foot rhytons. Plastic was poorly represented.

== See also ==
- Old Europe
- Butmir culture
- Early history of Bosnia and Herzegovina
