= Coppa Nevigata =

Coordinates: 41.5581°N 15.8339°E

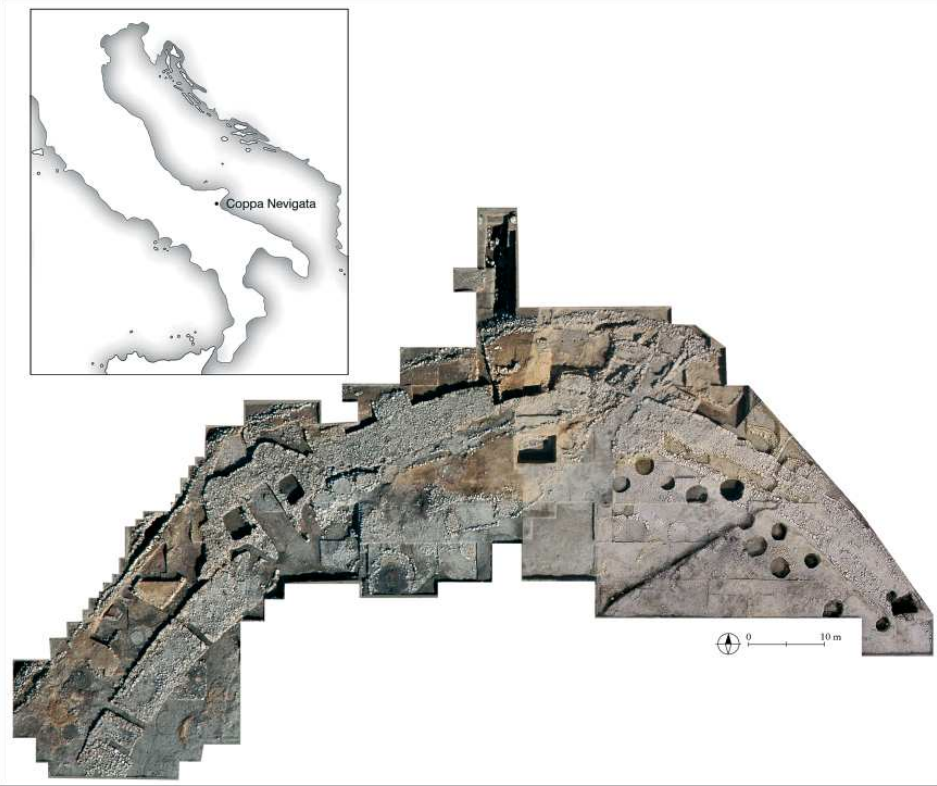
Map and Aerial view of the Copa Nevigata site and remains of the Bronze Age stone fortification wall

Coppa Nevigata is an archaeological site in the province of Foggia, southern Italy, southwest of Manfredonia, on the Apulian coast of the Gargano peninsula.

The earliest recorded human presence on the site, which was situated on the edge of a coastal lagoon, with easy access to the sea and numerous natural resources, dates back to the Neolithic, between the 7th and 5th millennia BC. At a later date, a settlement of the final Neolithic period continued into the Bronze Age; occupation at the site is attested for the Protoapennine, Apennine, and Subapennine phases of the Italian Bronze Age.

During the Bronze Age, a significant settlement arose that had contacts with the civilizations of the Aegean; these contacts are most visible during the Subapennine phase, when fragments of Mycenaean ceramics are found at the site. From the beginning of the Protoapennine phase, there is evidence for the extraction of purple dye from murex shells and for pressing of olives to extract olive oil. The purple dye production, starting around 1800 BC, is the earliest yet attested in Italy. This dye production increased through the 14th century BC, but sharply dropped off by the 12th century in the Subapennine phase. Some areas near the fortifications and on the shore of the lagoon were dedicated both to the processing and storage of cereals and to the extraction of purple dye; these activities were later moved within the settlement. The site was defended by dry stone fortification walls.

The site is currently under periodic excavation by a team from Sapienza University of Rome, under the direction of Alberto Cazzella.

== Bibliography ==
- P. Boccuccia, "Ricerche nell'area sud-orientale di Coppa Nevigata," in Taras, 15 (1995), pp. 153–174.
- S.M. Cassano, A. Cazzella, A. Manfredini, M. Moscoloni (eds.), Coppa Nevigata e il suo territorio, Rome 1987.
- A. Cazzella, "L'insediamento di Coppa Nevigata fra tarda età del Bronzo ed età del Ferro," in Archeologia Classica, 43 (1991), pp. 39–53.
- A. Cazzella, "La Puglia come area periferica del mondo miceneo: il caso di Coppa Nevigata," in Atti del II Convegno Internazionale di Studi Micenei, Rome-Naples 1996, pp. 1543–1549.
- A. Cazzella, M. Moscoloni, "La sequenza cronostratigrafica di Coppa Nevigata fra XVI e XIV secolo a.C.," in Rassegna di Archeologia, 10 (1992), pp. 533–543.
- G. Siracusano, "Le indagini archeozoologiche nel sito stratificato di Coppa Nevigata: una visione d'insieme," in Origini, 15 (1992), pp. 201–217
