= La Hoguette culture =

Neolithic ceramic archaeological culture, c. 5400–5000 BC

La Hoguette culture is an Early Neolithic ceramic archeological culture dating to approximately 5400–5000 BCE, though radiocarbon dating remains uncertain. The culture derives its name from the site of La Hoguette in Calvados, Normandy.

== Geography and distribution ==
La Hoguette culture's primary distribution extends from the Meuse, Rhine, and Moselle rivers in the north to the grotto of Gardon in the Ain department to the south, passing through the Jura in both France and Switzerland.

== Chronology and cultural context ==
In western Switzerland, La Hoguette culture was succeeded by the Cortaillod culture (5000–4500 BCE), which itself was followed by the Saint-Uze style (4500–4250 BCE). The interactions between La Hoguette and the Linear Pottery (Rubanean) culture remain poorly understood but are significant for understanding the Neolithicization of Switzerland. Current research suggests that La Hoguette's distribution—spanning from Baulmes-Abri de la Cure to Liestal and Gächlingen—extended into northeastern Switzerland before the Linear Pottery culture, which appears in Switzerland around 5200 BCE.

== Material culture ==
The characteristic ceramic forms of La Hoguette consist of ovoid vessels with inverted rims and conical bases, decorated with double dotted lines and scalloped cordons. This decorative style originates from Cardial pottery of southern France. The distribution area of La Hoguette style corresponds to that of asymmetrical triangular arrowheads (Bavans points or Danubian points) from the Pre-Ceramic Neolithic, suggesting continuity of occupation.

== Economy and settlement ==
On most sites, La Hoguette culture is known only through pottery finds. An occupation layer from this period at Stuttgart - Bad Cannstatt yielded, in addition to potsherds, some flint tools with parallels to the Late Mesolithic and two wooden harpoons made from deer antlers (indicating fishing), which may also be associated with this chronological phase. Bones of domesticated animals were also recovered, and pollen samples revealed the presence of cereals and ribwort plantain, suggesting that La Hoguette populations practiced both agriculture on open land and animal husbandry. However, no house foundations have been discovered, leaving the degree of settlement permanence unclear. Large quantities of La Hoguette pottery are found in ditches and habitation features of Linear Pottery sites, though it cannot be determined whether these represent primary or secondary deposits, and thus whether production was contemporary with or preceded the Linear Pottery culture.

== Bibliography ==
- Stöckli, Werner E.: Urgeschichte der Schweiz im Überblick (15'000 v.Chr.-Christi Geburt). Die Konstruktion einer Urgeschichte, 2016.
- Altorfer, Kurt; Hartmann, Chantal: Frühe Bauern im Klettgau. Der alt- und mittelneolithische Siedlungsplatz Gächlingen-Goldäcker, 2018.
