= Danilo culture =

Neolithic culture of the Dalmatian coast dating to 4700-3900 BC

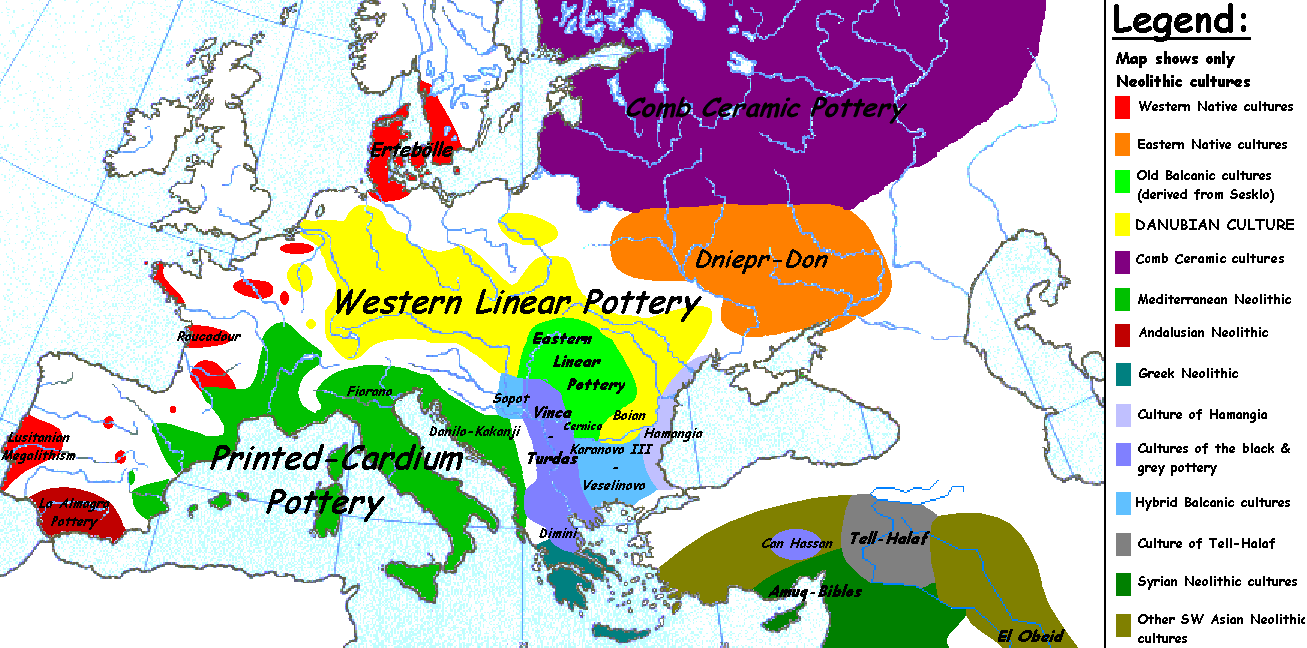
- European Middle Neolithic
- Horizon: Old Europe
- Period: Neolithic
- Dates: c. 4700–3900 BCE
- Major sites: Danilo, Croatia
- Preceded by: Cardium pottery culture
- Followed by: Hvar culture

Danilo culture (Croatian: Danilska kultura) was a Neolithic culture of the Dalmatian coast of Croatia and parts of Bosnia and Herzegovina, dating to 4700-3900 BC.

The major archaeological site of the culture is at Danilo polje, near today's Danilo, Croatia. The fertile oval valley between two karst ridges was cultivated for millennia due to its quality soil, whose clayey composition allows water to be retained in the lower layers.

The Danilo dig site consists of large numbers of pits and post holes whose associated material has been subdivided typologically into five phases.

There are two associated pottery styles, painted in black and broad red bands on buff ware, and incised on dark burnished ware, belong in the Middle Neolithic. The geometric designs suggest connections with contemporary wares in Italy, particularly Ripoli and Serra D'Alto. There was also a long blade and tanged point stone industry closely related to fishing.

== Gallery ==
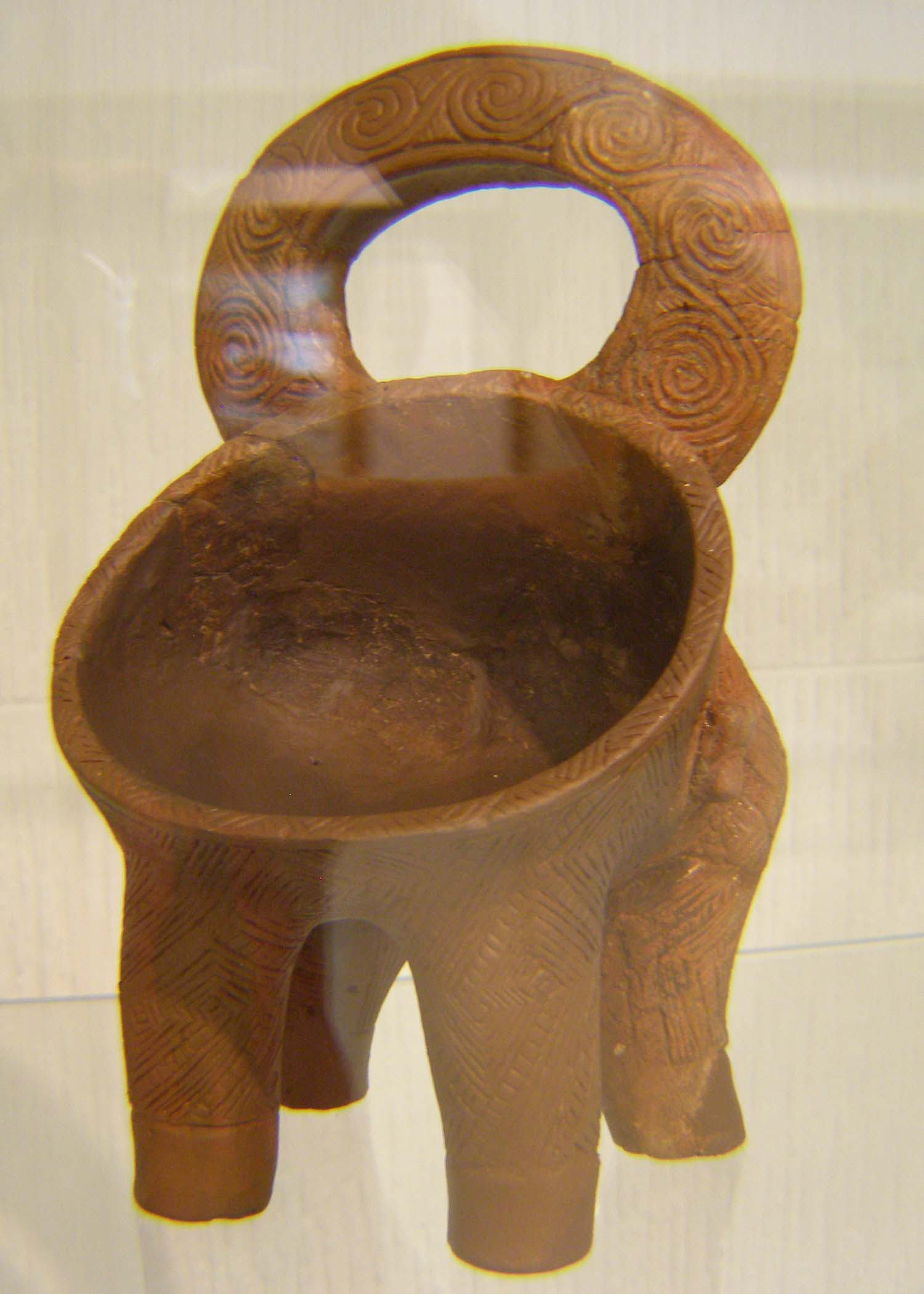
Ceramic rhyton

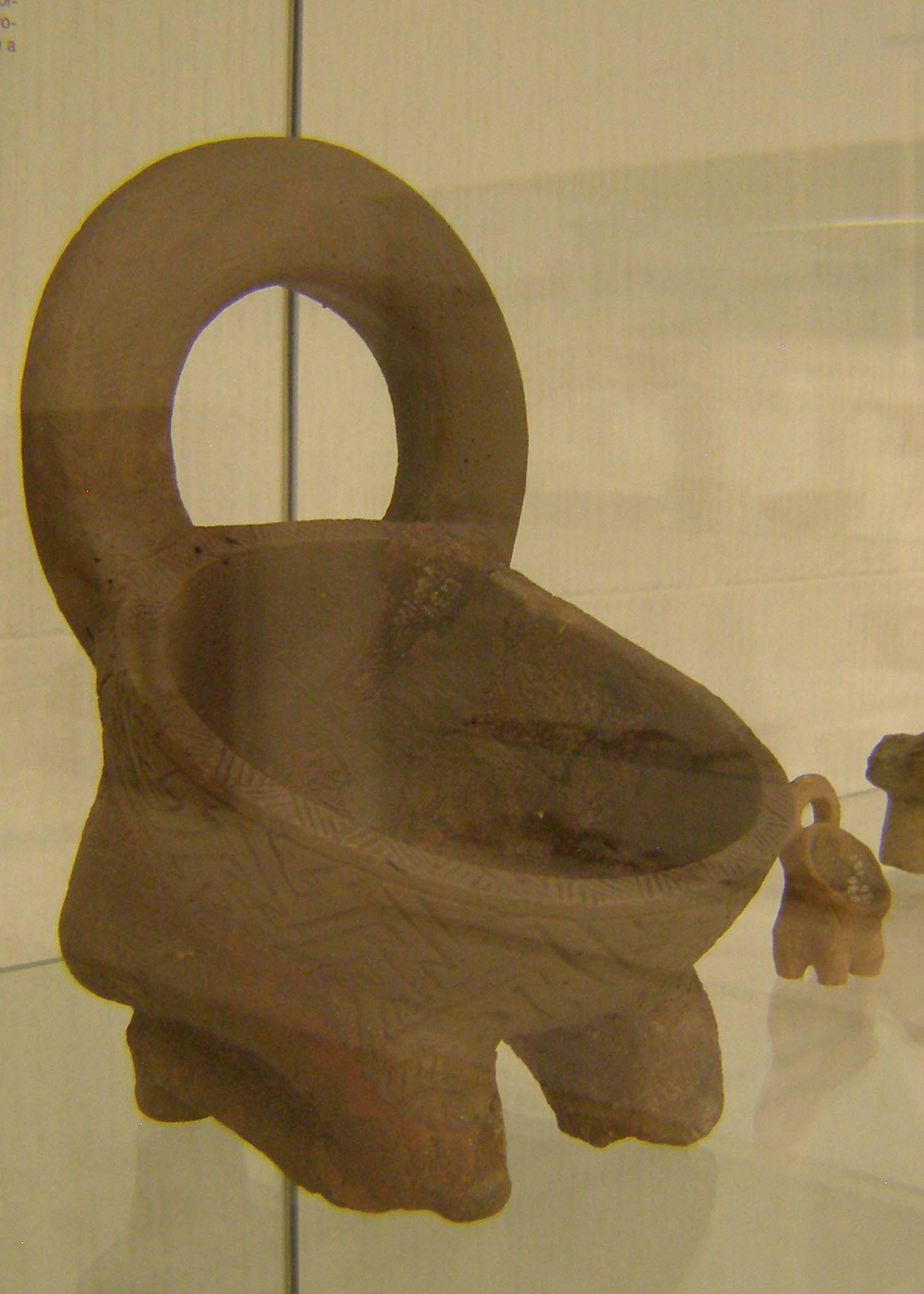
Ceramic rhyton

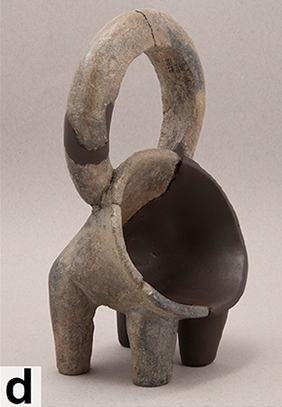
Rhyton

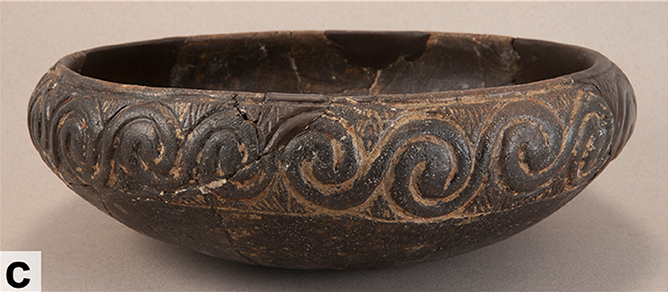
Ceramic dish

== See also ==
- Impressed Ware
- Kakanj culture

== Sources ==
- "Danilska kultura". Croatian Encyclopedia (in Croatian).
