= Trnjane =

Trnjane may refer to the following villages in Serbia:

- Trnjane (Aleksinac), municipality of Aleksinac
- Trnjane (Negotin), municipality of Negotin
- Trnjane (Požarevac), municipality of Požarevac
- Veliko Trnjane, municipality of Leskovac
- Gornje Trnjane, municipality of Leskovac
- Donje Trnjane, municipality of Leskovac

== See also ==
- Trnjani (disambiguation)
