= Starčevo site =

Archaeological site in Serbia

- Старчево (Serbian)
- Grad
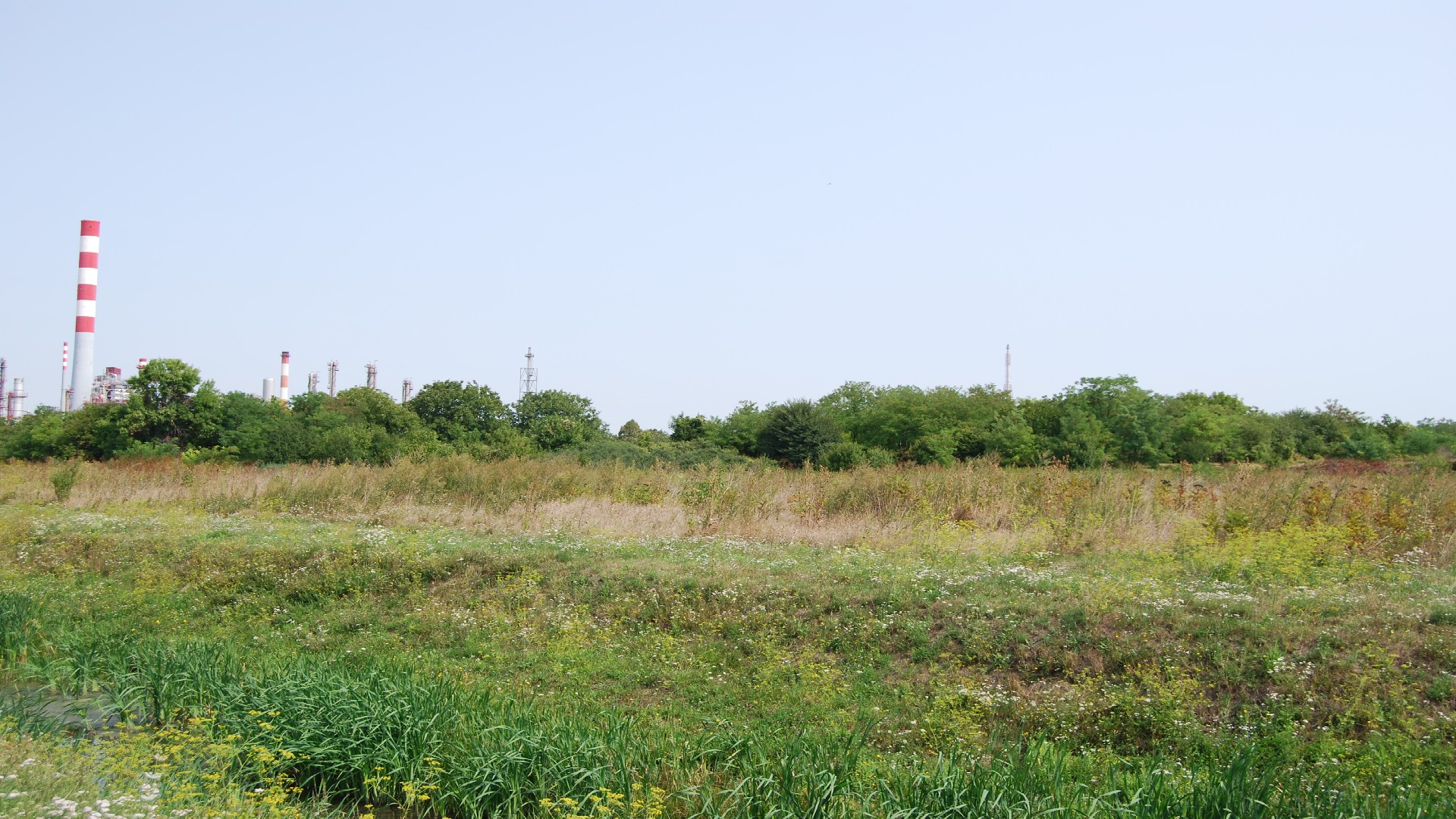
- Starčevo archaeological site

- Location within Serbia
- 44.8174°N 20.5719°E
- Type: Settlement
- Region: Serbia

Site notes
- Excavation dates: 1928

Cultural Heritage of Serbia
- Official name: Starčevo site (Grad)
- Type: Archeological Site of Exceptional Importance
- Designated: 8 April 1957
- Reference no.: AN 104

Starčevo (Serbian Cyrillic: Старчево), also known as Grad (Град) is the eponymous archaeological site of the Starčevo culture that has been dated to the Early Neolithic period. It is located on the left bank of the Danube, north-west from the village of Starčevo and 8 kilometers south of Pančevo, Serbia. Starčevo site has been in central register from 1993 as an Archaeological Site of Exceptional Importance.

== History ==
The first systematic archeological digging started in 1928, exploration with the sond took place during 1931 and 1932 and that represented collaboration between Public museum and Harvard University. In 1939 the leading excavator was Miodrag Grbić. In the middle of the 20th century exploration was done by Milutin Garašanin and Draga Garašanin. Revision of excavation was done in 1969 and was protected in 2003 and 2004. On the site they have discovered dugouts ellipsoidal and round shape, with a diameter between 2 and 6 meters, as well as several tombs with the deceased in a fetal position. Inside of the dugouts they have discovered masonry. From the movable material they have discovered stone and bone weapons, ceramics painted with geometric ornamentation, colored with white, red and black, as well an anthropomorphic figurine made out of terracotta.

== Cultural connection ==
The culture of Starčevo is connected with other sites from Balkan and middle Europe where they use the term Starčevo–Körös–Criș culture in Hungary and Romania sites to symbolize the union of three close culture: culture of Starčevo, Körös culture and Criș culture all of them located on the region of today southeast Hungary, Serbia and Romania.
