= Trnjani =

Trnjani may refer to:

- Trnjani, Bosnia and Herzegovina, a village near Doboj
- Trnjani, Croatia, a village near Garčin

== See also ==
- Trnjane (disambiguation), villages in Serbia
- Trnjaci (disambiguation), villages in Serbia and Bosnia
