= Sopot culture =

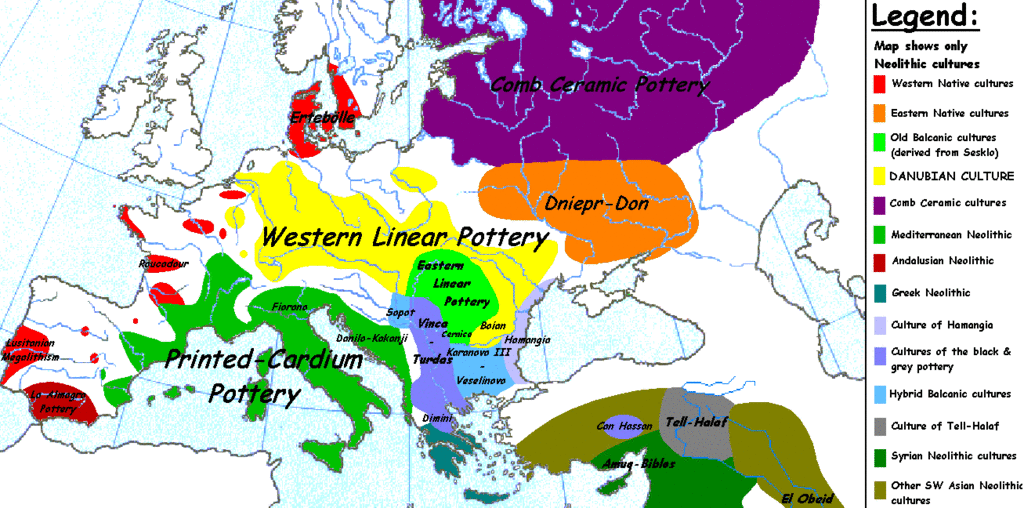
- Horizon: First Temperate Neolithic, Old Europe
- Period: Neolithic Europe
- Dates: c. 5,500 BC – c. 3,800 BC
- Type site: Sopot
- Preceded by: Starčevo culture, Vinča culture
- Followed by: Baden culture

The Sopot culture is a Neolithic archaeological culture that was first identified in eastern Slavonia in modern-day Croatia, and was since also found in several sites in Hungary. It was a continuation of the Starčevo culture and strongly influenced by the Vinča culture. Some of the archeological sites where artifacts of it were found include Samatovci, Vinkovci–Sopot, Otok, Privlaka, Vinkovci–Ervenica, Osijek, Bapska, Županja, Klokočevik. It spread into northern Bosnia from its original area to the west to northwestern Croatia and to the north to Hungarian Transdanubia, where it helped Lengyel culture start. The culture dates to around 5000 BC. Settlements were raised on the river banks (most noticeably on the banks of Bosut, around the area of the modern city of Vinkovci). Houses were square and made of wood using interlace technique, sometimes separated into multiple rooms. Artefacts include many weapons made of bone, flint, obsidian, and ironed volcanic rocks and some ceramic pottery of various sizes (biconical pots with two handles, conic bowls, pots, and s-shaped pots) decorated by carvings or light stabbings and painting.

The eponym site is Sopot, an archeological site near Vinkovci, which was dated to 5480–3790 BC. The culture was first identified in 1949 by Vladimir Milojčić, and first named after this site in 1968 by Stojan Dimitrijević, and has been generally referred to as such since 1971.

== Genetics ==
In a 2017 genetic study published in Nature, the remains of six individuals ascribed to the Sopot culture in Hungary were analyzed. Of the four samples of Y-DNA extracted, two belonged to G2a2b-L30 or various subclades of it, one belonged to I2-L596, and one belonged to J2. mtDNA extracted were various subclades of U8b1b, H, T2c1, K1a, and HV0a.

Studies by Mathieson et al. 2018 and Patterson et al. 2022 analyzed two female samples from Croatia, mtDNA haplogroups found were N1a1a and T2b. The seven samples analyzed until then according to ADMIXTURE analysis had approximately 87-98% Early European Farmers, 2-12% Western Hunter-Gatherer, and 0-4% Western Steppe Herders-related ancestry.

A 2021 study by Freilich and colleagues published in Nature tested the genomes of 19 individuals from the Sopot culture in Croatia. Out of the seven Y-DNA samples retrieved, three belonged to haplogroups G2a2, two to I2a2a-M223, one to J, and one to C1a2b-Z38888. The mtDNA haplogroups fell under various subclades of H, J2b1, K1a, K2b, N1a1a1, T2b, T2c1, T2f, U5b2, and U8b1.

== See also ==
- Old Europe (archaeology)

== Sources ==
- Lipson, Mark (November 16, 2017). "Parallel palaeogenomic transects reveal complex genetic history of early European farmers". Nature. 551 (7680). Nature Research: 368–372. Bibcode:2017Natur.551..368L. doi:10.1038/nature24476. PMC 5973800. PMID 29144465.
- Narasimhan, Vagheesh M. (September 6, 2019). "The formation of human populations in South and Central Asia". Science. 365 (6457) eaat7487. American Association for the Advancement of Science. bioRxiv 10.1101/292581. doi:10.1126/science.aat7487. PMC 6822619. PMID 31488661.
- Freilich, Suzanne (2021). "Reconstructing genetic histories and social organisation in Neolithic and Bronze Age Croatia". Scientific Reports. 11 (1): 16729. Bibcode:2021NatSR..1116729F. doi:10.1038/s41598-021-94932-9. PMC 8373892. PMID 34408163. S2CID 237214710.
- Patterson, Nick; et al. (2022). "Large-scale migration into Britain during the Middle to Late Bronze Age" (PDF). Nature. 601 (7894): 588–594. Bibcode:2022Natur.601..588P. doi:10.1038/s41586-021-04287-4. PMC 8889665. PMID 34937049. S2CID 245509501.
- Obelić, Bogomil; Krznarić Škrivanko, Marija; Marijan, Boško; Krajcar Bronić, Ines (2004). "Radiocarbon Dating of Sopot Culture Sites (Late Neolithic) in Eastern Croatia". Radiocarbon. 46 (1). Department of Geosciences, University of Arizona: 245–255. Bibcode:2004Radcb..46..245O. doi:10.1017/s0033822200039564. ISSN 0033-8222.
- Kramberger, Bine (2014). "Evaluation of Dimitrijević's Definition of the Sopot Culture in the Light of Radiocarbon Dates". Opuscula Archaeologica: Papers of the Department of Archaeology. 37/38 (1). Department of Archaeology, Faculty of Humanities and Social Sciences, University of Zagreb: 359–370. doi:10.17234/OA.37.15.
- Tripković, Boban; Dimitrijević, Vesna; Rajković, Dragana (December 2016). "Marine shell hoard from the Late Neolithic site of Čepin-Ovčara (Slavonia, Croatia)". Documenta Praehistorica. XLIII. University of Ljubljana Press: 343–362. doi:10.4312/dp.43.17.
