= Zadubravlje =

- Village
- Interactive map of Zadubravlje
- Location within Croatia
- Coordinates: 45.163°N 18.154°E
- Country: Croatia
- County: Brod-Posavina

Area
  - Total: 13.8 km^{2} (5.3 sq mi)

Population (2021)
  - Total: 750
  - Density: 54/km^{2} (140/sq mi)

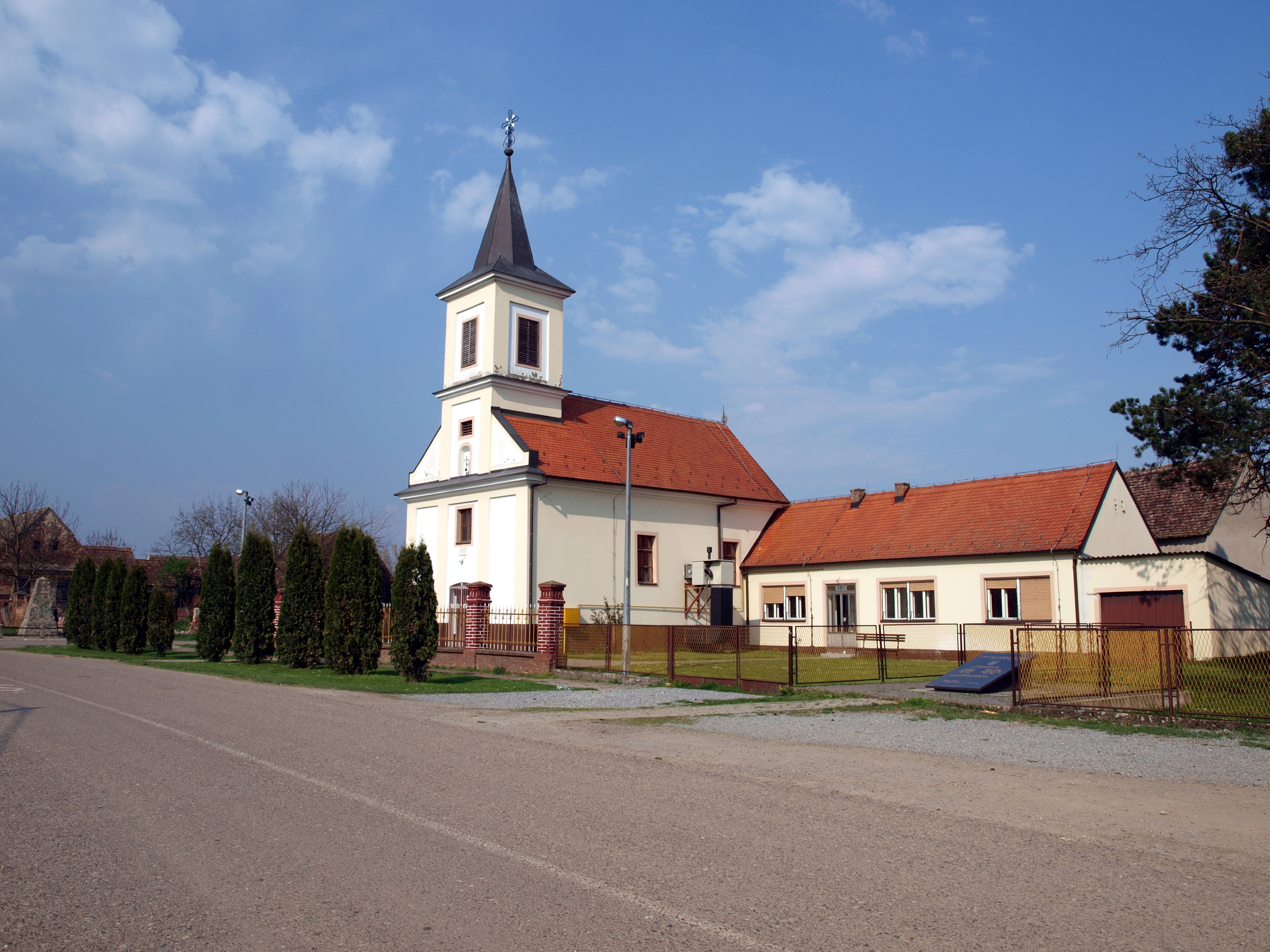

Zadubravlje is a village in the municipality of Garčin, in Brod-Posavina County, Croatia. The population is 912 (census 2011).

The Neolithic pit houses discovered in 1988 at Dužine, a location about 2 kilometres (1.2 mi) east of Zadubravlje, during construction of today's A3 motorway, are believed to be associated with the Starčevo culture, and have been dated by archeologists to around 6,000 years BCE.
