= Trnjaci =

Trnjaci may refer to the following villages:

- Trnjaci (Bijeljina), in municipality of Bijeljina, Bosna and Herzegovina
- Trnjaci (Brčko), in Brčko District, Bosna and Herzegovina
- Trnjaci, Ub, in municipality of Ub, Serbia

== See also ==
- Trnjani (disambiguation)
