= Garčin =

- Municipality
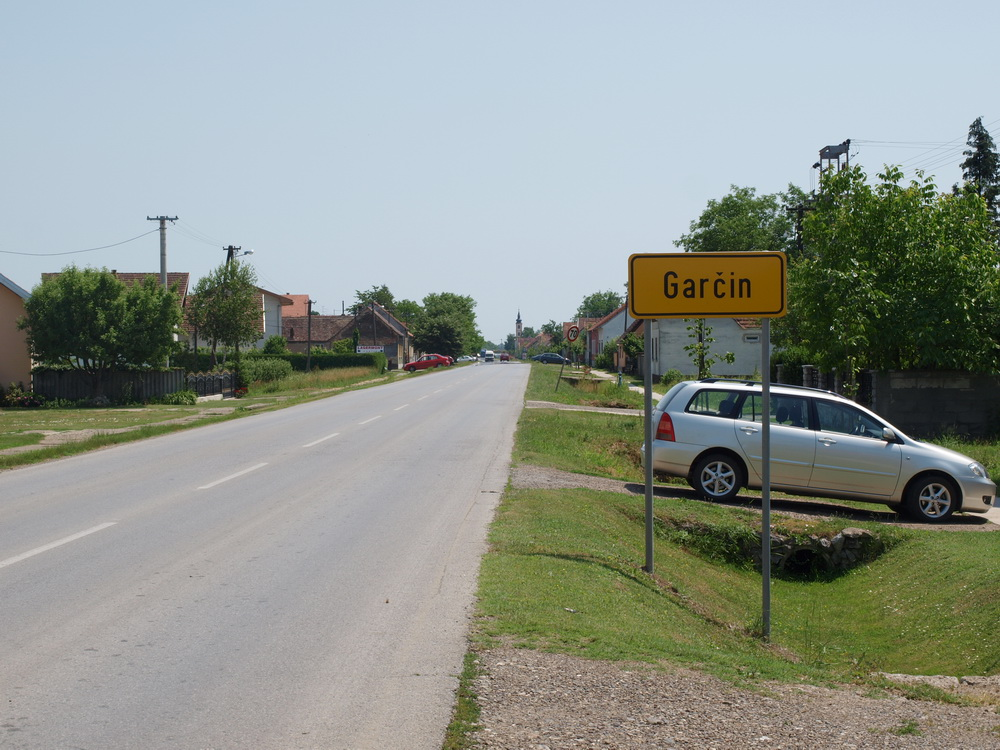
- Interactive map of Garčin
- Location within Croatia
- Coordinates: 45°10′55″N 18°11′02″E
- Country: Croatia
- County: Brod-Posavina County

Government
  - Mayor: Mato Grgić (HDZ)

Area
  - Municipality: 88.3 km^{2} (34.1 sq mi)
  - Urban: 18.7 km^{2} (7.2 sq mi)

Population (2021)
  - Municipality: 3,951
  - Density: 44.7/km^{2} (116/sq mi)
  - Urban: 733
  - Urban density: 39.2/km^{2} (102/sq mi)
- Time zone: UTC+1 (CET)
  - Summer (DST): UTC+2 (CEST)
- Postal code: 35212 Garčin
- Area code: (+385) 35
- Website: opcina-garcin.hr

Garčin is a village and a municipality in Brod-Posavina County, Croatia.

== Demographics ==
In 2021, the municipality had 3,951 residents in the following 8 settlements:

- Bicko Selo, population 432
- Garčin, population 733
- Klokočevik, population 477
- Sapci, population 406
- Selna, population 284
- Trnjani, population 697
- Vrhovina, population 172
- Zadubravlje, population 750
Garčin: Population trends 1857–2021
v

population	2841	3169	3011	4035	4467	5250	5066	5463	5769	6014	6088	5804	5607	5542	5586	4806	3951
	1857	1869	1880	1890	1900	1910	1921	1931	1948	1953	1961	1971	1981	1991	2001	2011	2021

Sources: Croatian Bureau of Statistics publications

In the 2011 census, 92% of the residents were Croats.

== Politics ==
=== Minority councils ===
Directly elected minority councils and representatives are tasked with consulting tasks for the local or regional authorities in which they are advocating for minority rights and interests, integration into public life and participation in the management of local affairs. At the 2023 Croatian national minorities councils and representatives elections Serbs of Croatia fulfilled legal requirements to elect 10 members minority councils of the Municipality of Garčin but the elections were not held due to the lack of candidates.

== See also ==
- Garčin railway station
