= Starčevo =

Starčevo Старчево
- Village (Selo)
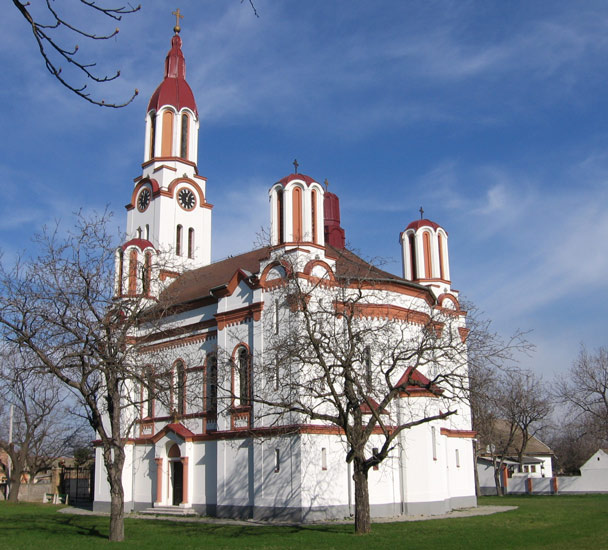
- Serbian Orthodox church

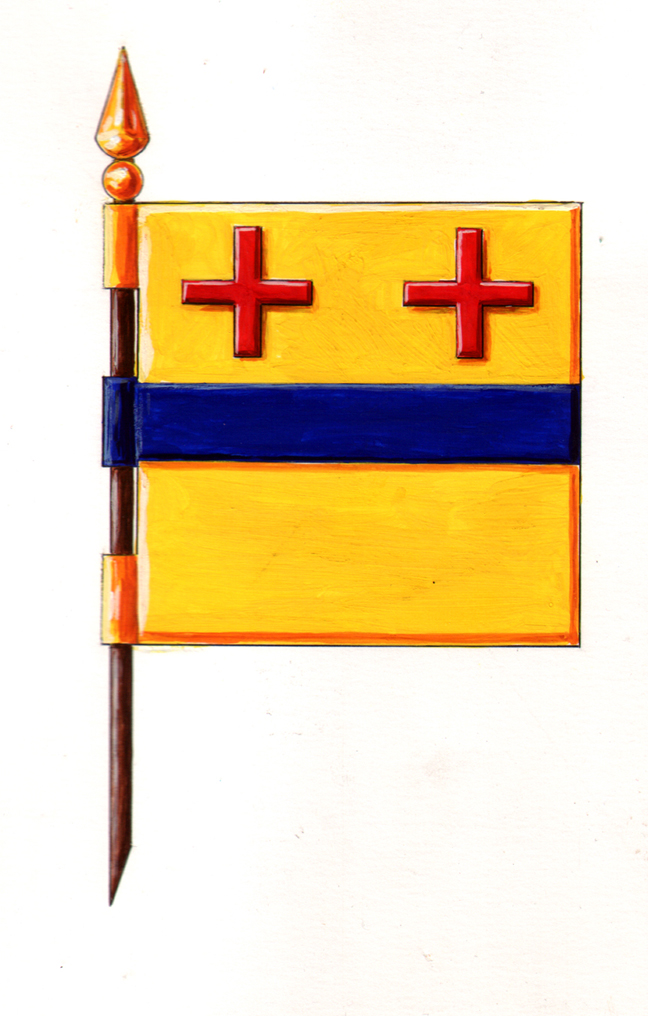
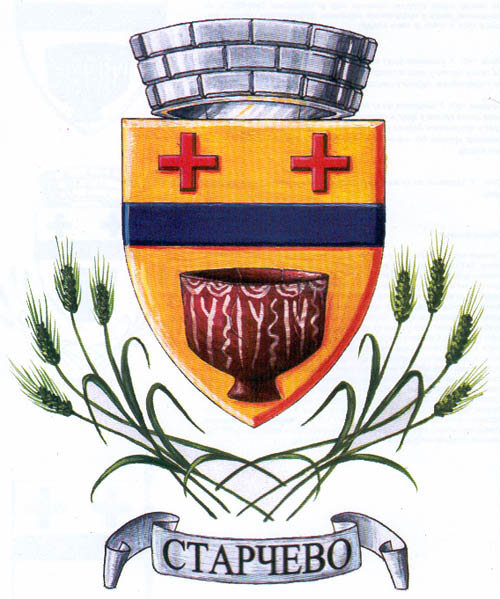
- Flag Seal

- Location of Starčevo within Serbia Starčevo (Serbia) Starčevo (Europe)
- Coordinates: 44°48′26″N 20°42′17″E
- Country: Serbia
- Province: Vojvodina
- District: South Banat
- Municipality: Pančevo

Area
  - Total: 62.07 km^{2} (23.97 sq mi)

Population (2022)
  - Total: 6,661
  - Density: 107.3/km^{2} (277.9/sq mi)
- Time zone: UTC+1 (CET)
  - Summer (DST): UTC+2 (CEST)
- Postal code: 26232
- Area code: +381 13
- Website: starcevo.org.rs

Starčevo (Serbian Cyrillic: Старчево) is a town located in the Pančevo municipality, in the South Banat District of Serbia. It is situated in the Autonomous Province of Vojvodina. The town has a Serb ethnic majority and its population is 6,661 people (2022 census).

The name of the town means "the place of the old man" in Serbian (starac, "elder"). The Neolithic Starčevo culture was named after the Starčevo site.

== Demographics (2002 census) ==
Ethnic groups in the town:

- Serbs = 6,205
- Croats = 349
- Yugoslavs = 204
- Hungarians = 111
- others

== Historical population ==
Historical population
Year	Pop.	±%
1948	3,880	—
1953	3,676	−5.3%
1961	4,854	+32.0%
1971	6,545	+34.8%
1981	7,304	+11.6%
1991	7,579	+3.8%
2002	7,615	+0.5%
2008	8,048	+5.7%

== Gallery ==
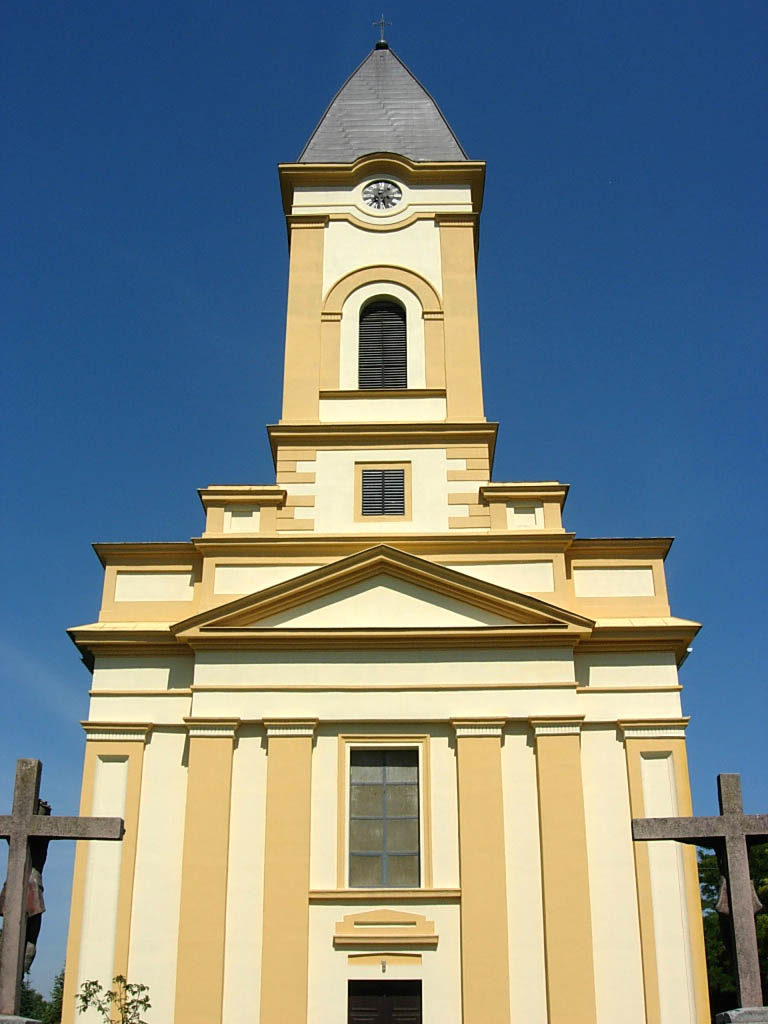
Roman Catholic Church Saint Maurus

== See also ==
- Starčevo-Körös
- List of places in Serbia
- List of cities, towns and villages in Vojvodina
