= Starčevo–Körös–Criș culture =

Grouping of archaeological cultures

Starčevo culture
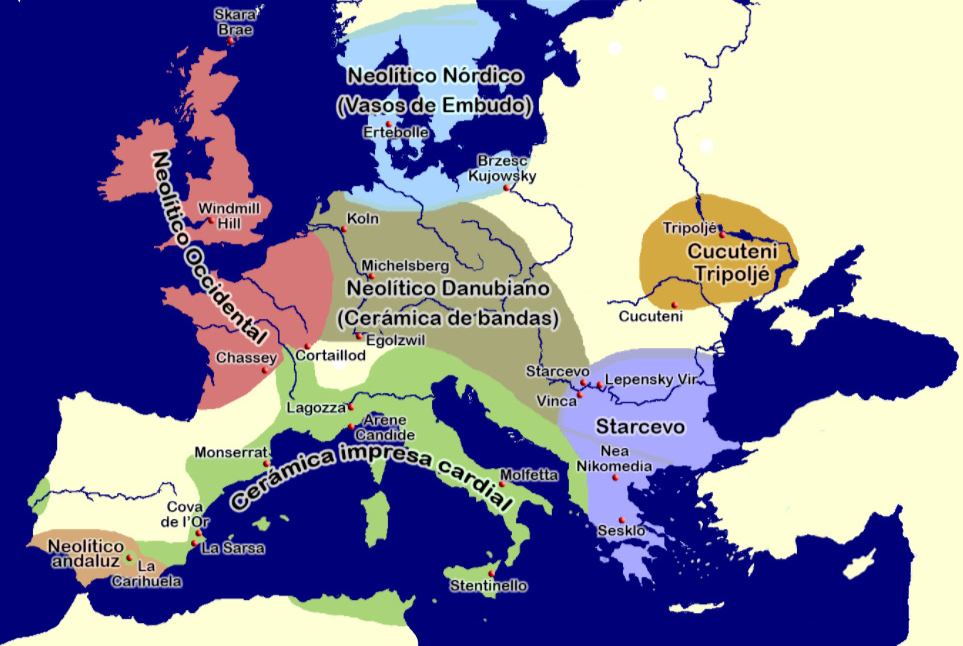
- Alternative names: Starčevo
- Horizon: First Temperate Neolithic, Old Europe
- Period: Neolithic
- Dates: circa 6,200 B.C.E. — circa 4,500 B.C.E.
- Type site: Starčevo
- Preceded by: Sesklo culture, Neolithic Greece, Mesolithic Romania
- Followed by: Vinča culture, Karanovo culture, Gumelnița culture, Hamangia culture, Linear Pottery culture

The Starčevo–Körös–Criș culture is a grouping of two related Neolithic archaeological cultures in Southeastern Europe: the Starčevo culture and the Körös or Criș culture.

== Settlements ==
Some of the earliest settlements of the Starčevo–Körös–Criș culture were discovered in the Banat Plain and southwest Transylvania. Culture sites were also discovered in the north-west Balkans, which yielded painted pottery noted for its "barbotine" vessel surfaces. Specifically, the Starčevo settlements were located in Serbia, Körös in Hungary, and Criș in Romania.

== Characteristics ==
The Starčevo culture is an archaeological culture of Southeastern Europe, in what is now Serbia, dating to the Neolithic period between c. 5500 and 4500 BCE (according to other sources, between 6200 and 5200 BCE). The Starčevo culture is sometimes grouped together and sometimes not.

The Körös culture is another Neolithic archaeological culture, but in Central Europe. It was named after the river Körös in eastern Hungary and western Romania, where it is named Criș. It survived from about 5800 to 5300 BC.

== Gallery ==
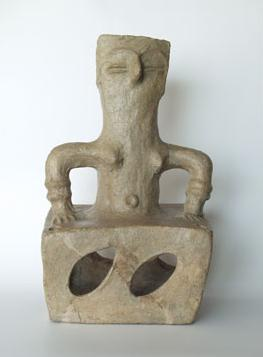
Starčevo culture sculpture

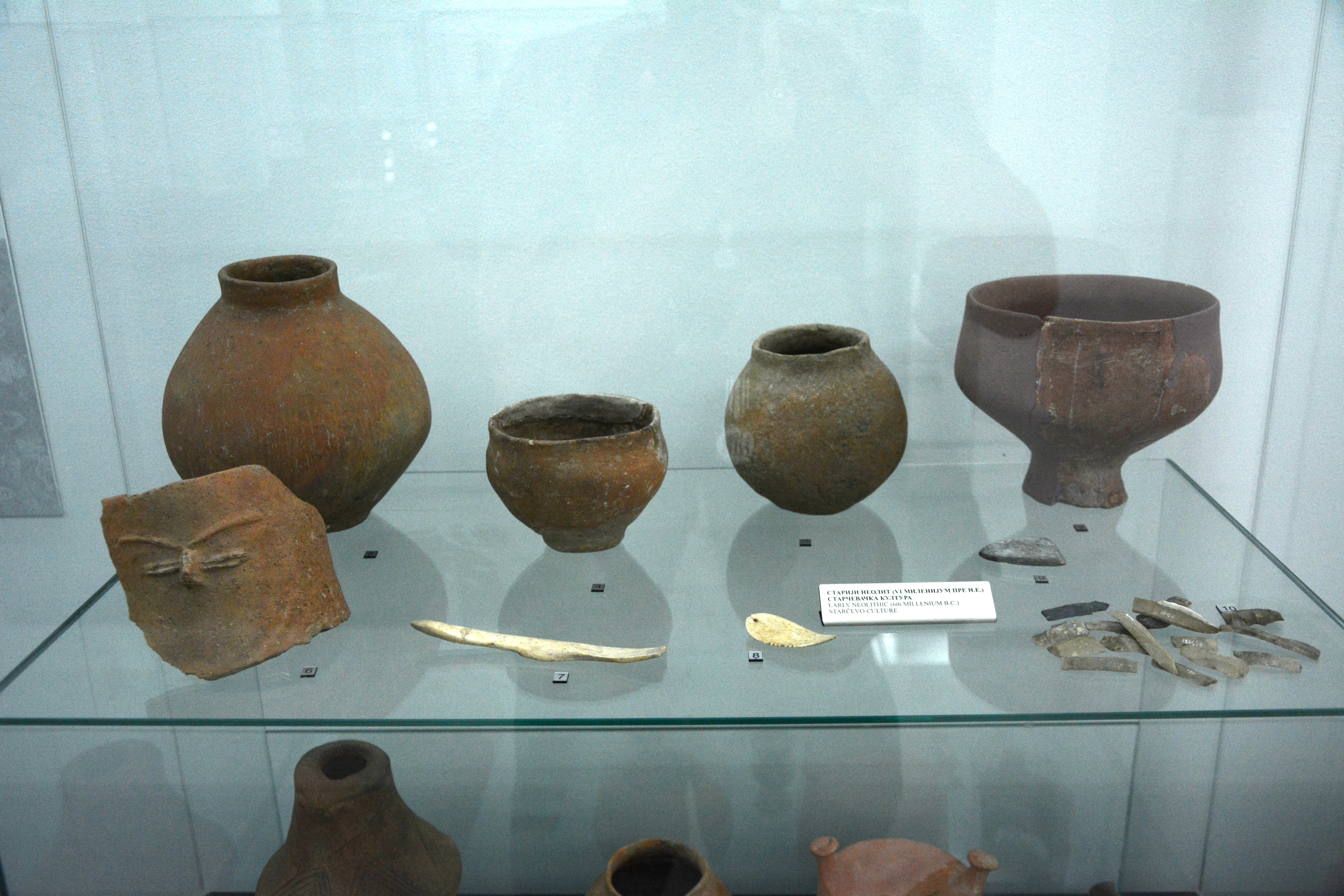
Starčevo culture artefacts

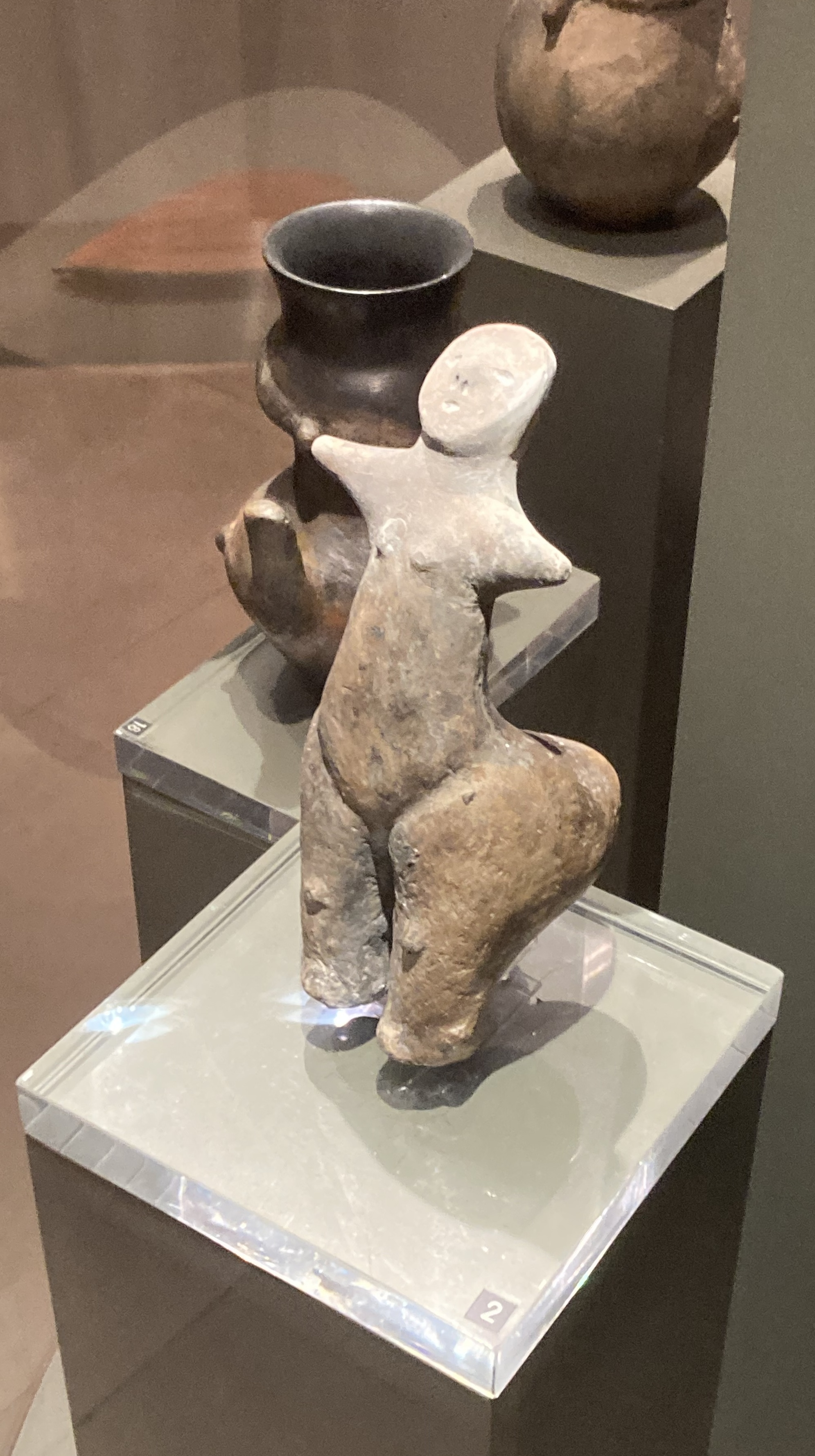
Körös/Criş culture figurine

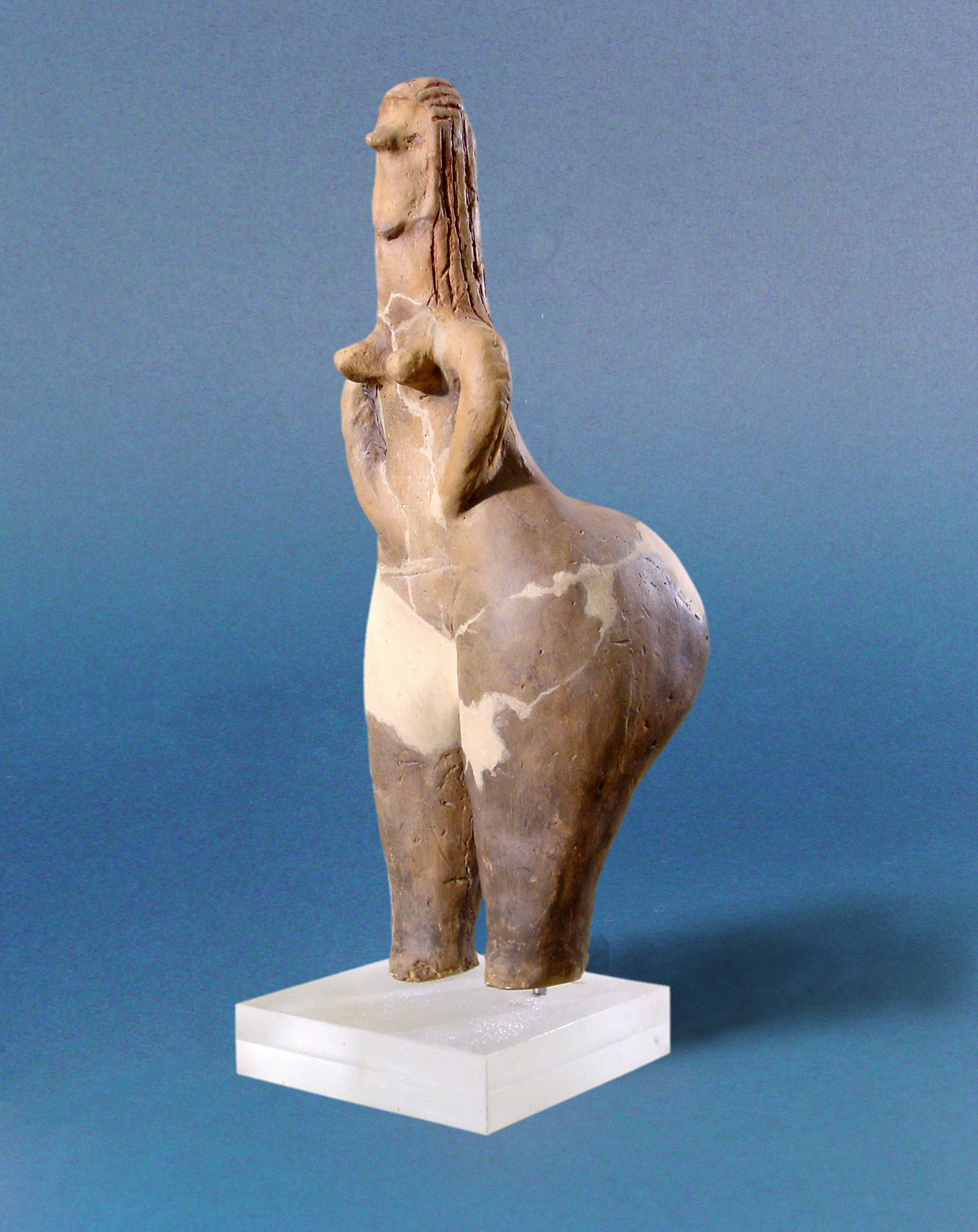
"Red-haired goddess" figurine

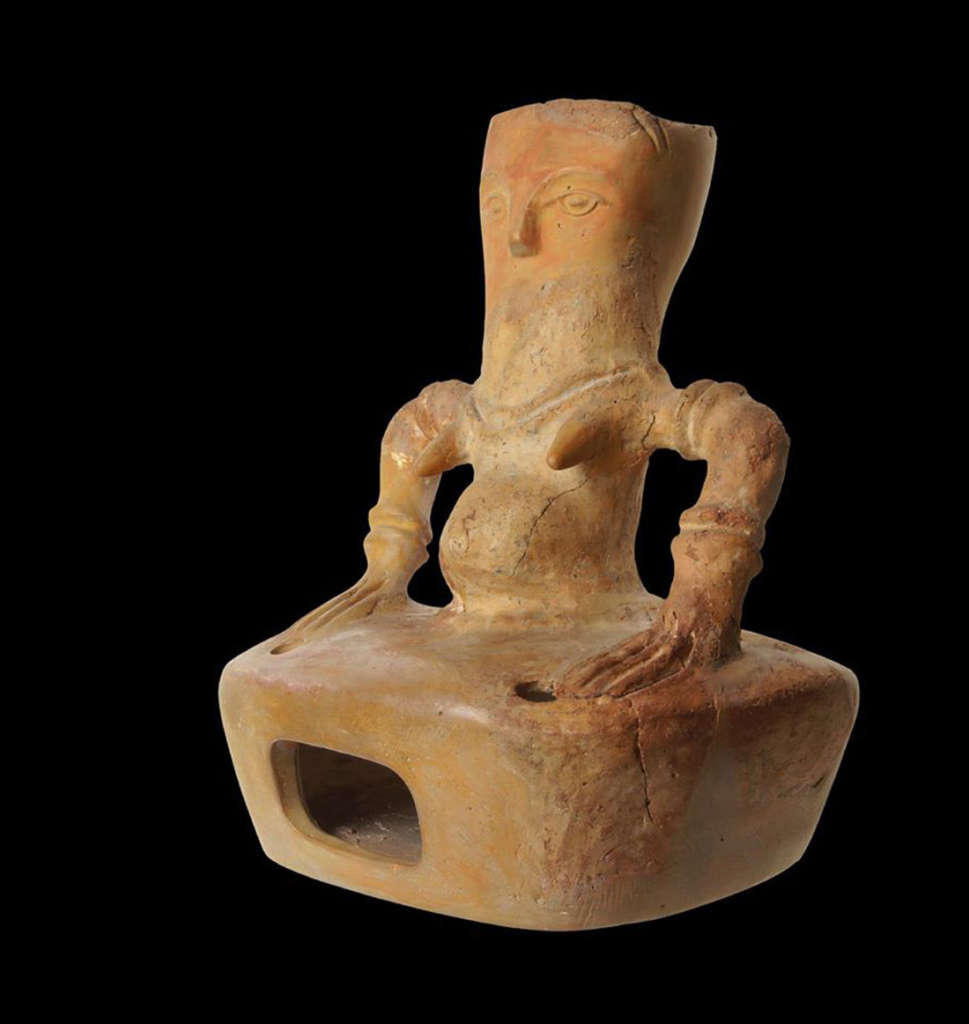
Ceramic figurine

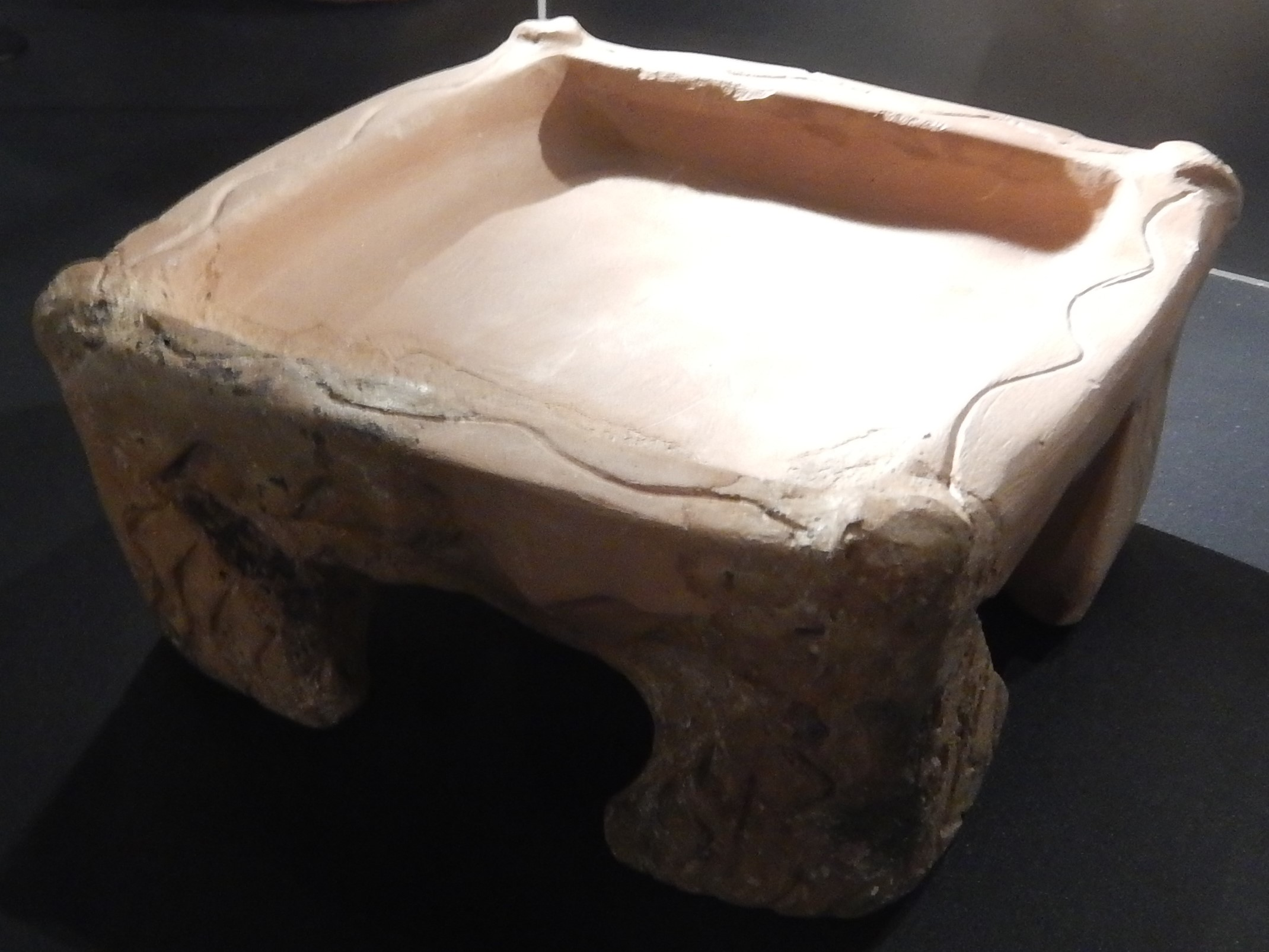
Starčevo ceramic altar

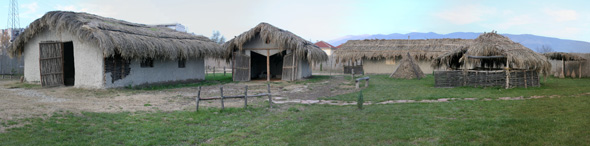
Reconstruction of a settlement at Tumba Madzari, Macedonia

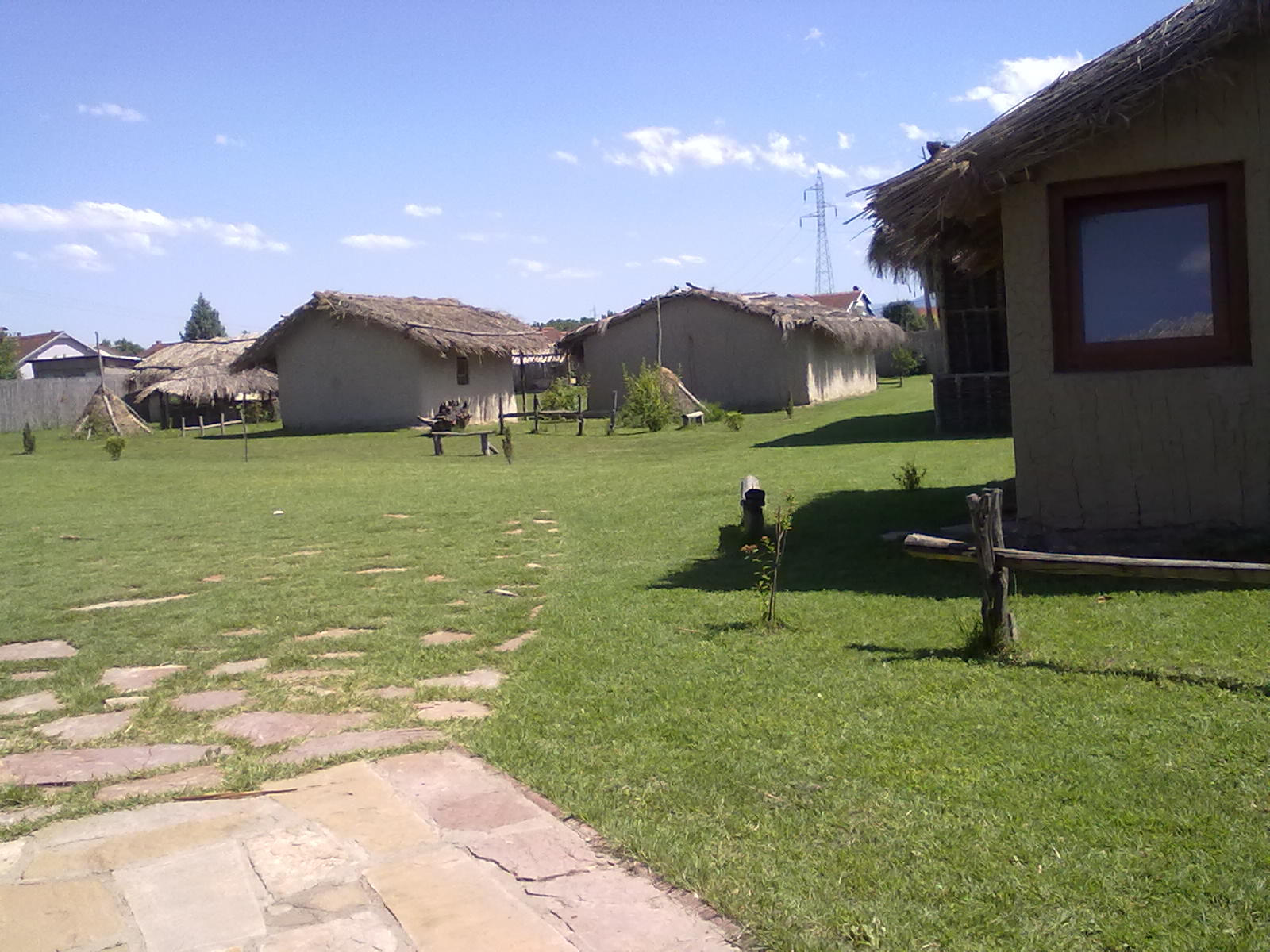
Reconstructed houses at Tumba Madžari

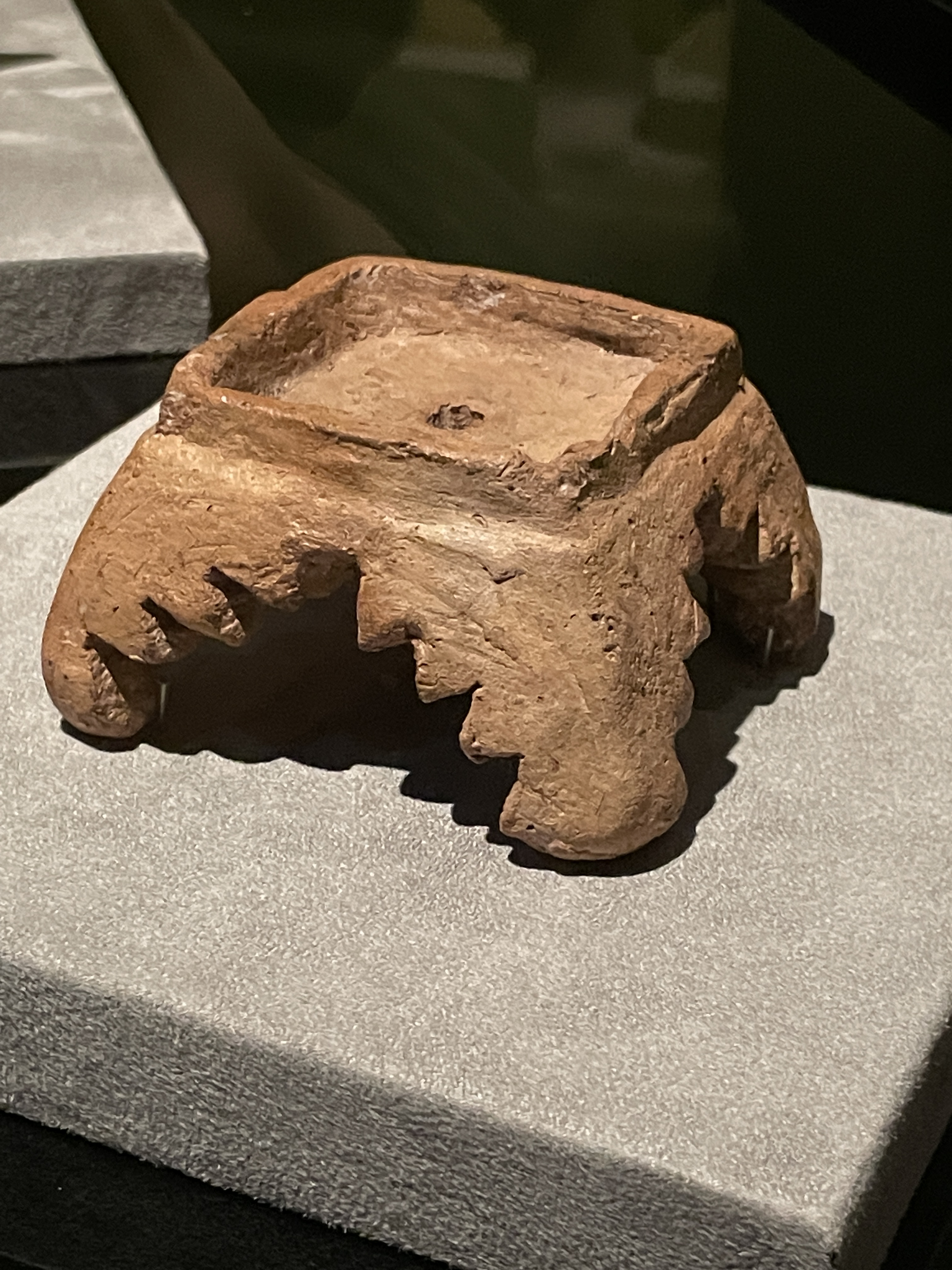
Ceramic altar, Macedonia

== Sources ==
- Tringham, Ruth (13 November 2014). Hunters, Fishers and Farmers of Eastern Europe, 6000-3000 B.C. Routledge. pp. 80–. ISBN 978-1-317-59946-3.
- Shaw, Ian; Jameson, Robert (6 May 2002). A Dictionary of Archaeology. John Wiley & Sons. pp. 541–. ISBN 978-0-631-23583-5.
- Whittle, Alisdair (2 September 2003). The Archaeology of People: Dimensions of Neolithic Life. Routledge. pp. 136–. ISBN 978-1-134-40982-2.
- Barker, Graeme (11 July 1985). Prehistoric Farming in Europe. CUP Archive. pp. 90–. ISBN 978-0-521-22810-7.
- Milisauskas, Sarunas (2002). European Prehistory: A Survey. Springer Science & Business Media. pp. 155–. ISBN 978-0-306-46793-6.
- Thorpe, I. J. (2 September 2003). The Origins of Agriculture in Europe. Routledge. pp. 29–. ISBN 978-1-134-62009-8.
