= First Temperate Neolithic =

Archaeological horizon of Neolithic Southeastern Europe

The First Temperate Neolithic (FTN) is an archaeological horizon consisting of the earliest archaeological cultures of Neolithic Southeastern Europe, dated to c. 6400–5100 BCE. The cultures of the FTN were the first to practice agriculture in temperate Europe, which required significant innovations in farming technology previously adapted to a mediterranean climate.

The constituent cultures of the FTN are:

- the Starčevo–Kőrös–Criș culture, encompassing:

- the Starčevo culture, c. 6200–5200 BCE, western Bulgaria, Serbia, Bosnia, eastern Croatia and western Hungary;
- the Kőrös culture, c. 6400–5100 BCE, eastern Hungary;
- the Criş culture, c. 6400–5200 BCE, Romania;

- the Karanovo I/II culture, c. 6300–5100 BCE, central and southern Bulgaria;
- the Macedonian First Neolithic, c. 6600–5300 BCE, North Macedonia;
- the Poljanica group, c. 6300–5200 BCE, northeast Bulgaria;
- the West Bulgarian Painted Ware culture, c. 6200–5200 BCE, western Bulgaria.
- the Vinča culture, c. 5400–4500 BC, Serbia and near countries

== See also ==
- Old Europe (archaeology)
