= Trnjani, Croatia =

Trnjani
- Village
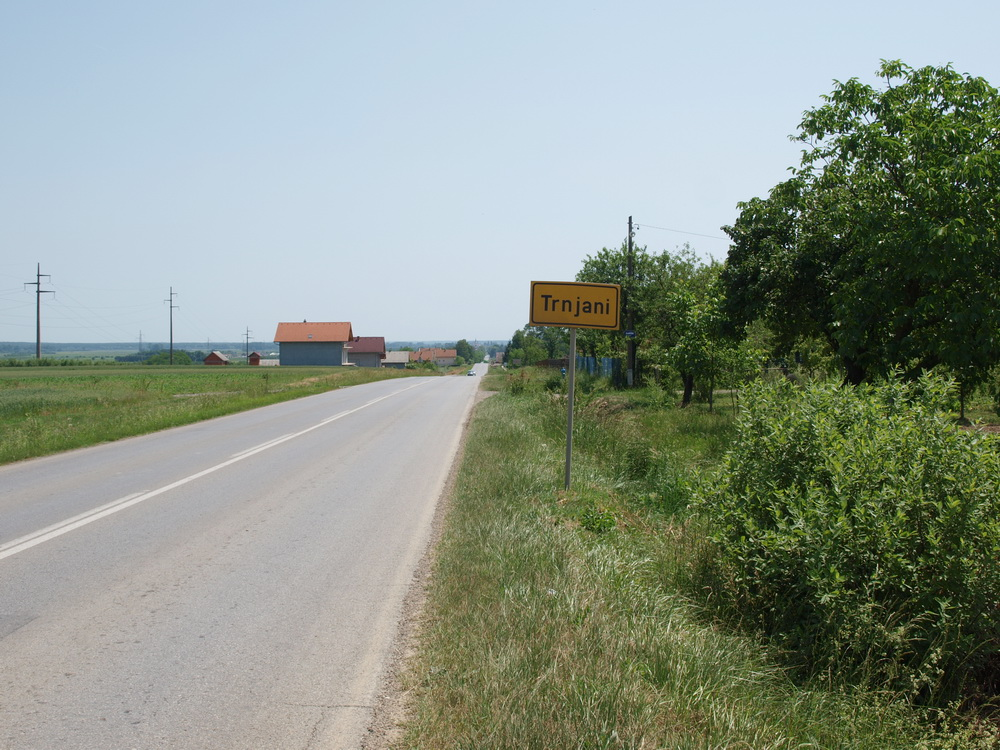
- Interactive map of Trnjani
- Location within Croatia
- Coordinates: 45.186°N 18.15°E
- Country: Croatia
- County: Brod-Posavina

Area
  - Total: 10.4 km^{2} (4.0 sq mi)

Population (2021)
  - Total: 697
  - Density: 67.0/km^{2} (174/sq mi)

Trnjani is a village in the municipality of Garčin, in Brod-Posavina County, Croatia. The population is 786 (census 2011).

== History ==
In 1941 Ustaše regime demolished the local Serbian Orthodox Church of the Nativity of the Most Holy Mother of God. The church was rebuilt after the end of World War II in Yugoslavia (renovated just before the Homeland War)but the new building was also itself destroyed on 27 August 27 1992, during the Croatian War of Independence. The destruction took place the night before the Feast of the Assumption. The attackers mistakenly believed this was the church’s patron feast day, although it was actually the Nativity of the Mother of God.
