= Körös culture =

Archaeological culture

- Horizon: First Temperate Neolithic, Old Europe
- Period: Neolithic
- Dates: circa 5,800 B.C.E. — circa 5,300 B.C.E.
- Preceded by: Starčevo culture, Mesolithic Europe
- Followed by: Linear Pottery culture

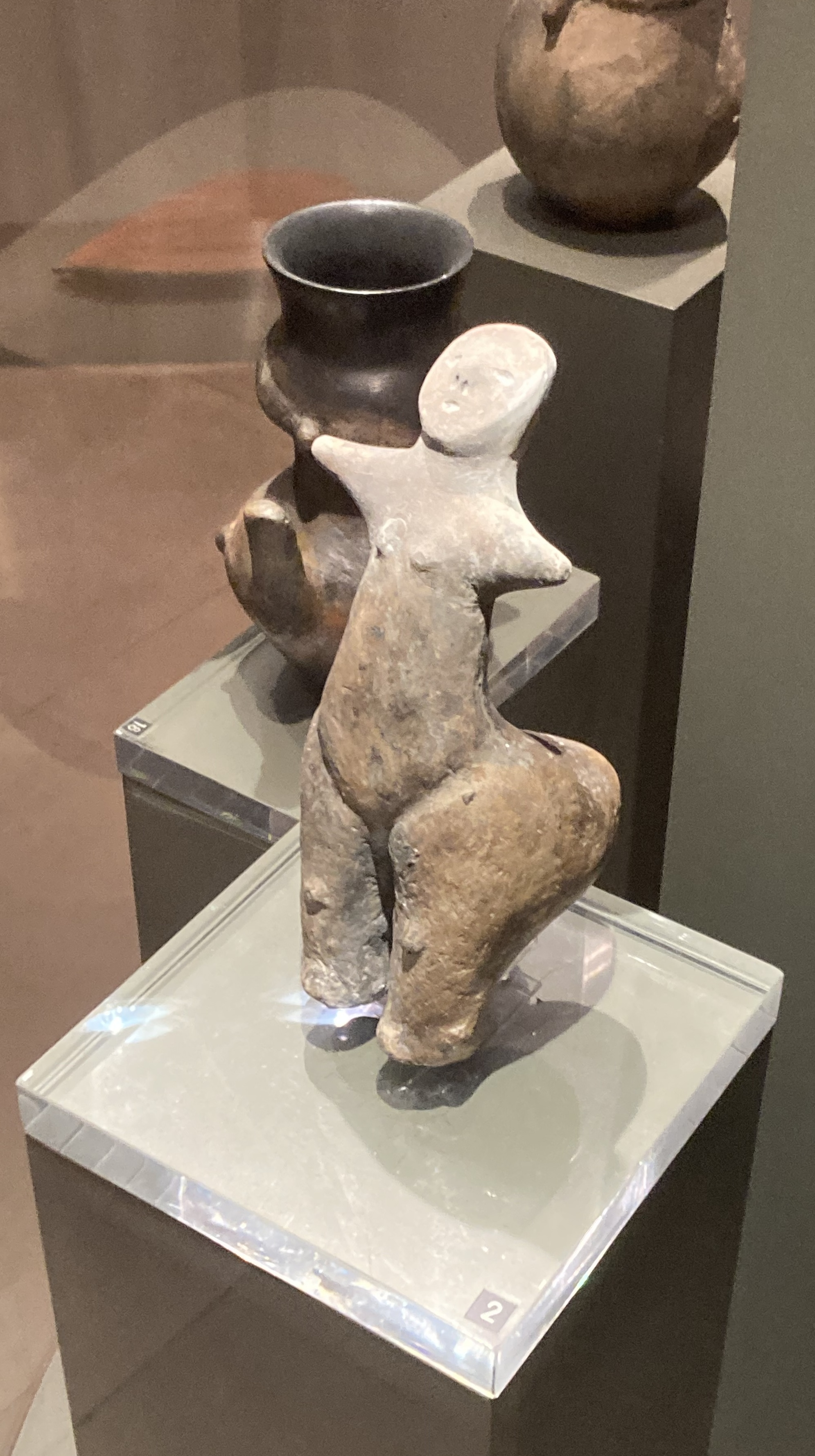
Neolithic Venus figurine, produced by the Körös culture. Found in Méhtelek, Hungary

The Körös culture is a Neolithic archaeological culture in Central Europe that was named after the river Körös in Hungary, hence the name Körös culture. The two variants of the river name are used for the same archaeological culture in different regions: The Körös culture in Hungary and the Criș culture in Romania. The Körös culture survived from about 5800 to 5300 BC. It is related to the neighboring Starčevo culture and is included within a larger grouping known as the Starčevo–Körös–Criş culture.

== Genetics ==
In a 2017 genetic study published in Nature, the remains of six individuals ascribed to the Körös culture was analyzed. Of the two samples of Y-DNA extracted, one belonged to I2a2, and one belonged to G. Of the six samples of mtDNA extracted, five were subclades of K1, and one was a sample of H.

== Sources ==
- Lipson, Mark (November 16, 2017). "Parallel palaeogenomic transects reveal complex genetic history of early European farmers". Nature. 551 (7680). Nature Research: 368–372. Bibcode:2017Natur.551..368L. doi:10.1038/nature24476. PMC 5973800. PMID 29144465.
- Narasimhan, Vagheesh M. (September 6, 2019). "The formation of human populations in South and Central Asia". Science. 365 (6457) eaat7487. American Association for the Advancement of Science. bioRxiv 10.1101/292581. doi:10.1126/science.aat7487. PMC 6822619. PMID 31488661.
- Trbuhović, V. (2006). Indoevropljani [Indo-Europeans]. Belgrade: Pešić i sinovi.
