= Trnjani (Doboj) =

Coordinates: 44.8275°N 18.0872°E

Trnjani Трњани
- Village
- Location within Bosnia and Herzegovina
- Country: Bosnia and Herzegovina
- Entity: Republika Srpska
- Municipality: Doboj
- Time zone: UTC+1 (CET)
  - Summer (DST): UTC+2 (CEST)

Trnjani (Cyrillic: Трњани) is a village in the municipality of Doboj, Republika Srpska, Bosnia and Herzegovina.
