= Tumba Madžari =

Neolithic settlement in North Macedonia

Coordinates: 42°00′05″N 21°30′18″E

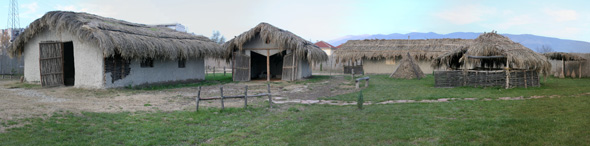
Reconstruction of a neolithic village at the archaeological site at Tumba Madzari

Tumba (Macedonian: Тумба Маџари) is a Neolithic settlement located in the north-eastern part of Skopje, North Macedonia and it is the most significant Neolithic settlement in Skopje valley. It was discovered in 1961/2 in the course of the archaeological trial excavations related to the construction of the motorway.

== Excavation ==
The first archaeological excavations were conducted in 1978 by the Museum of Macedonia, under the leadership of Voislav Sanev. The stratigraphy of the settlement has a cultural layer that indicates life was continuously taking place in the period between year 6000 and 4300 BC.

== Discoveries ==
The land was used mostly for agriculture, conserving the remains of a multifaceted settlement. The evidence of the multiple stages of the settlement is found within a three-foot layer which shows the three stages of life within the community and that the settlement was part of the Anzabegovo-Vršnik cultural group. One of the first structures found was a house, believed to be a sanctuary, demonstrating evidence for religion.

The most representative finding of site is the discovery of Pre-Indo-European sculptures of the Great Mother, suggesting the existence of the Cult of the Great Mother Goddess. These findings are remarkable evidence of the material and spiritual life and high artistic and aesthetic achievements of the Neolithic man from Macedonia.

In July 2024, following a 10-year hiatus of archaeological work at Tumba Madžari, a figurine of the "Great Mother" dating from 8,000 BC was unearthed at the site. Along with plans to further emphasize the site as part of Skopje tourism, the lead archaeologist announced plans to submit an application for the site's inclusion on the UNESCO World Heritage List.
