= Cucuteni–Trypillia culture =

Neolithic–Eneolithic archaeological culture of southeastern Europe

The Cucuteni–Trypillia culture, also known as the Cucuteni culture or Trypillia culture, is a Neolithic–Chalcolithic archaeological culture (c. 5050 to 2950 BC) of Southeast Europe. It extended from the Carpathian Mountains to the Dniester and Dnieper regions, centered on modern-day Moldova and covering substantial parts of western Ukraine and northeastern Romania, encompassing an area of 350,000 km^{2} (140,000 sq mi), with a diameter of 500 km (300 mi; roughly from Kyiv in the northeast to Brașov in the southwest).

The majority of Cucuteni–Trypillia settlements were of small size, high density (spaced 3 to 4 kilometres apart), concentrated mainly in the Siret, Prut and Dniester river valleys. During its middle phase (c. 4100 to 3500 BC), populations belonging to the Cucuteni–Trypillia culture built some of the largest settlements in Eurasia, some of which contained as many as three thousand structures and were possibly inhabited by 20,000 to 46,000 people. The 'mega-sites' of the culture, which have been claimed to be early forms of cities, were the largest settlements in Eurasia, and possibly the world, dating to the 5th millennium BC. The population of the culture at its peak may have reached or exceeded one million people. The culture was wealthy and influential in Eneolithic Europe and the late Trypillia culture has been described by scholar Asko Parpola as thriving and populous during the Copper Age. It has been proposed that it was initially egalitarian and that the rise of inequality contributed to its downfall.

The Cucuteni–Trypillia culture had elaborately designed pottery made with the help of advanced kilns, advanced architectural techniques that allowed for the construction of large buildings, advanced agricultural practices, and developed metallurgy. The economy was based on an elaborate agricultural system, along with animal husbandry, with the inhabitants knowing how to grow plants that could withstand the ecological constraints of growth. Cultivation practices of the culture were important in the establishment of the cultural steppe in the present-day region as well.

The remains of a potter's wheel from the middle of the 5th millennium BC is the oldest potter's wheel ever found, predating evidence of similar wheels in Mesopotamia by several hundred years. The culture also has the oldest evidence for the existence of wheeled vehicles, in the form of miniature wheeled models, which predate any evidence of wheeled vehicles in Mesopotamia by several hundred years. Some archaeologists and historians have argued that wheeled vehicles were invented in the Cucuteni–Trypillia culture and spread to other areas from there, though this remains a controversial and disputed idea.

One of the most notable aspects of this culture was the periodic destruction of settlements, with each single-habitation site having a lifetime of roughly 60 to 80 years. The purpose of burning these settlements is a subject of debate among scholars; some of the settlements were reconstructed several times on top of earlier habitational levels, preserving the shape and the orientation of the older buildings. One location, the Poduri site in Romania, revealed thirteen habitation levels that were constructed on top of each other over many years.

== Nomenclature ==
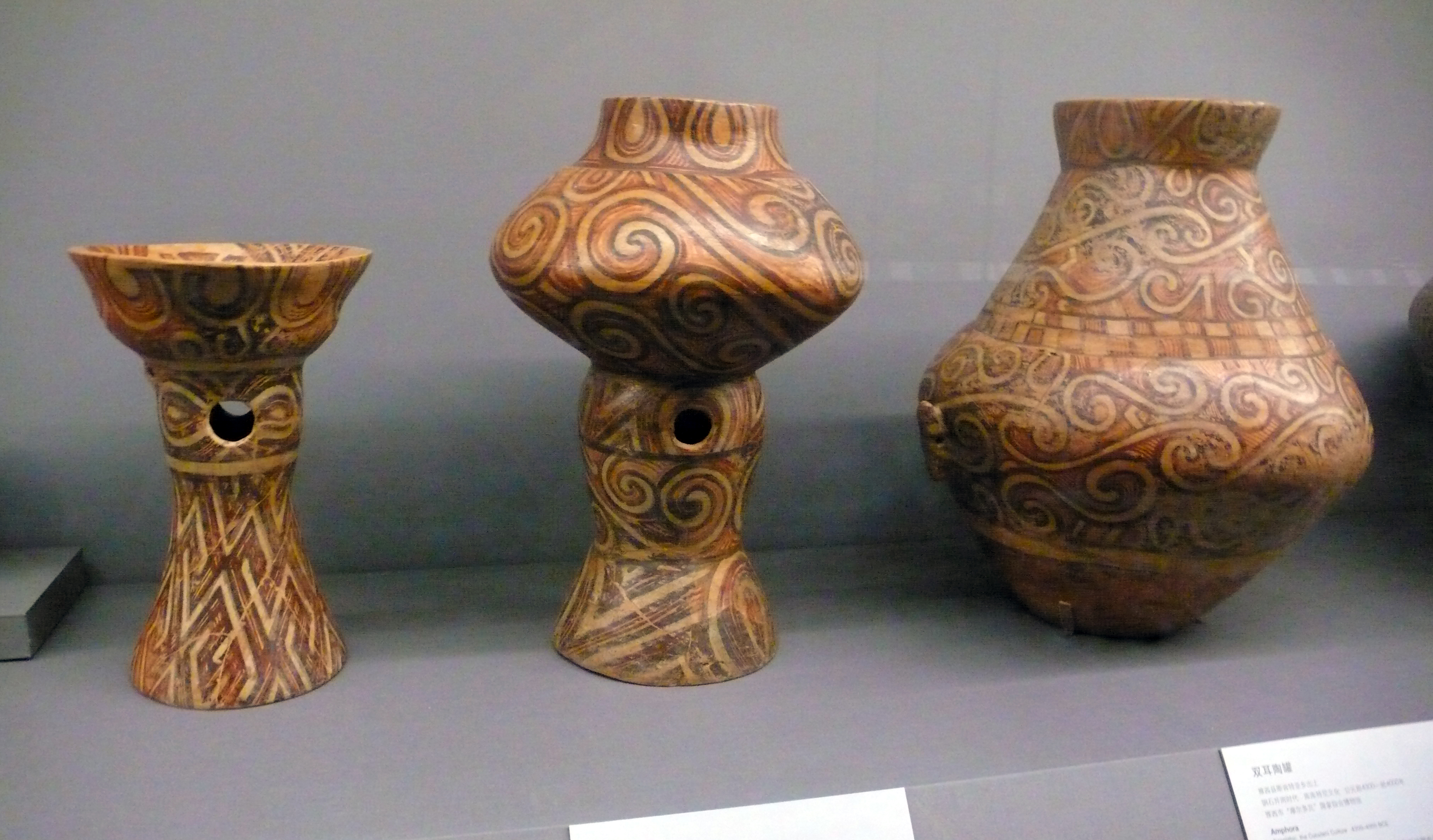
Three Chalcolithic ceramic vessels, from left to right: a bowl on stand, a vessel on stand and an amphora, ca. 4300–4000 BC. From Scânteia, Romania and displayed at the Moldavia National Museum Complex

The culture was first named and described in 1884 by Teodor T. Burada, after Cucuteni, a village in Iași County, Moldavia region, Romania. After having seen ceramic fragments in the gravel used to maintain the road from Târgu Frumos to Iași, Burada investigated the quarry in Cucuteni from where the material was collected, where he found fragments of pottery and terracotta figurines.

In the spring of 1885, Burada and other scholars from Iași, including the poet Nicolae Beldiceanu and archeologists Grigore Butureanu, Dimitrie C. Butculescu and George Diamandy, began the first excavations at Cucuteni. Their findings were published in 1885 and 1889, and presented in two international conferences in 1889, both in Paris: at the International Union for Prehistoric and Protohistoric Sciences by Butureanu and at a meeting of the Society of Anthropology of Paris by Diamandi.

At the same time, the first Ukrainian sites ascribed to the culture were discovered by Vincenc Chvojka (Vikentiy Khvoyka), a Czech-born Ukrainian archeologist, in Kyiv at Kyrylivska street 55. The year of his discoveries has been variously claimed as 1893, 1896 and 1887. In 1897 Vincenc Chvojka presented his findings at the 11th Congress of Archaeologists, which is considered the official date of the discovery of the Trypillia culture in Ukraine.

In the same year, similar artifacts were found in the village of Trypillia (Ukrainian: Трипiлля), in Kyiv Oblast, Ukraine. As a result, this culture became identified in Ukrainian publications, and later in Soviet Russia, as the 'Tripolie' (or 'Tripolye', from Russian Триполье), 'Tripolian' or 'Trypillia' culture.

Today, the finds from Romania and Ukraine, and those from Moldova, are recognised as belonging to the same cultural complex. It is generally called the Cucuteni culture in Romania and the Trypillia culture in Ukraine. In English, "Cucuteni–Tripolye culture" is most commonly used to refer to the whole culture, with the Ukrainian-derived term "Cucuteni–Trypillia culture" gaining currency following the dissolution of the Soviet Union.

== Geography ==
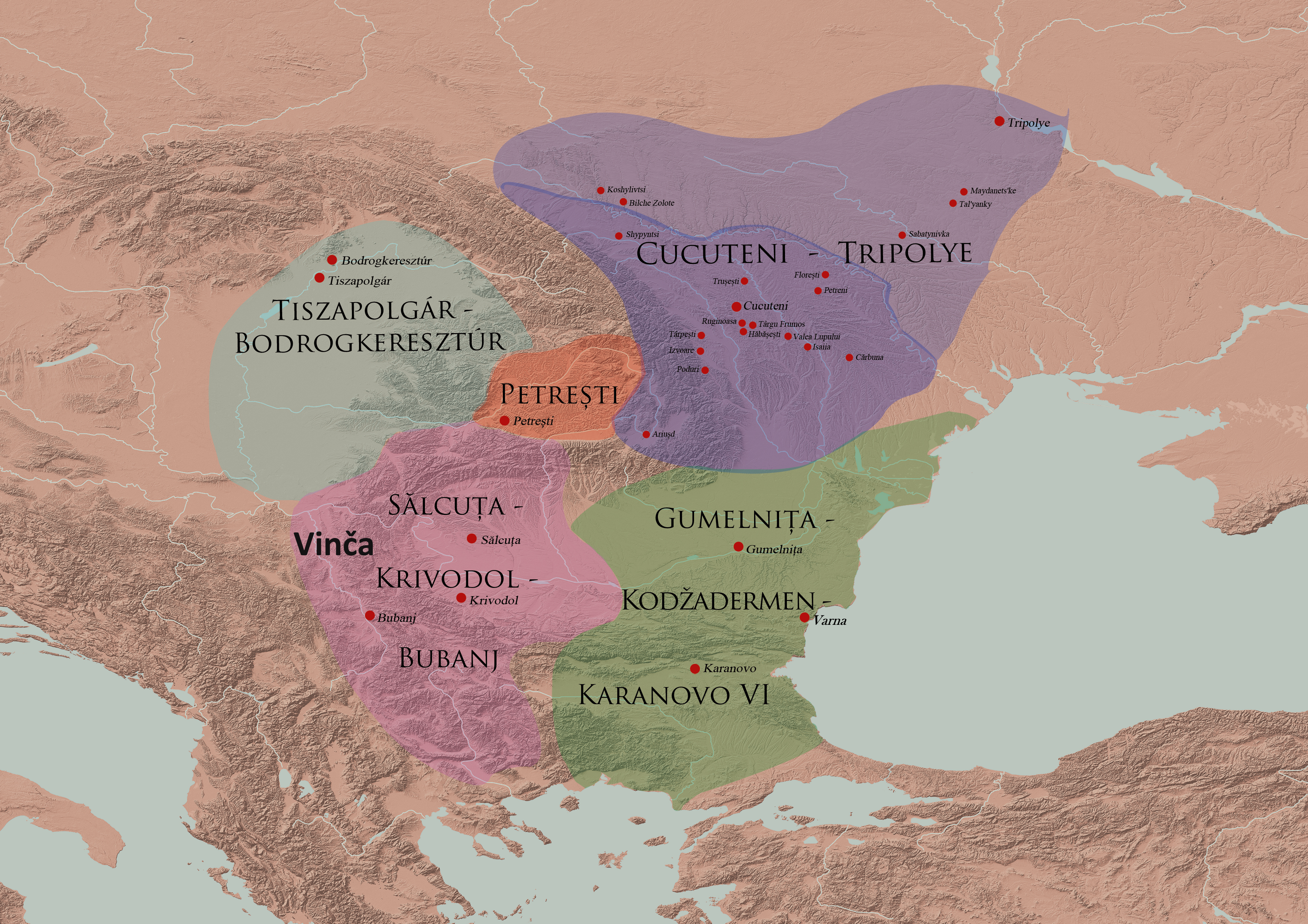
Chalcolithic cultures of Southeastern Europe, with major archaeological sites. (See: Old Europe)

The Cucuteni–Trypillia culture flourished in the territory of what is now Moldova, eastern and northeastern Romania, and parts of Western, Central, and Southern Ukraine.

The culture extended northeast from the Danube river basin around the Iron Gates to the Black Sea and the Dnieper. It encompassed the central Carpathian Mountains as well as the plains, steppe, and forest steppe on either side of the range. Its historical core lay around the middle to upper Dniester, the Podolian Upland. During the Atlantic and Subboreal climatic periods in which the culture flourished, Europe was at its warmest and moistest since the end of the last Ice Age, creating favorable conditions for agriculture in this region.

As of 2003, about 3,000 cultural sites had been identified, ranging from small villages to "vast settlements consisting of hundreds of dwellings surrounded by multiple ditches".

== Chronology ==
=== Periodization ===
Traditionally separate schemes of periodization have been used for the Ukrainian Trypillia and Romanian Cucuteni variants of the culture. The Cucuteni scheme, proposed by the German archaeologist Hubert Schmidt in 1932, distinguished three cultures: Pre-Cucuteni, Cucuteni and Horodiștea–Foltești. They were further divided into phases (Pre-Cucuteni I–III and Cucuteni A and B).

The Ukrainian scheme was first developed by Tatiana Sergeyevna Passek in 1949 and divided the Trypillia culture into three main phases (A, B, and C) with further sub-phases (BI–II and CI–II). Initially based on informal ceramic seriation, both schemes have been extended and revised since first proposed, incorporating new data and formalised mathematical techniques for artifact seriation.

The Cucuteni–Trypillia culture is commonly divided into Early, Middle, and Late periods, with varying smaller sub-divisions marked by changes in settlement and material culture. A key point of contention lies in how these phases correspond to radiocarbon data. The following chart represents this most current interpretation:

• Early (Pre-Cucuteni I–III to Cucuteni A–B, Trypillia A to Trypillia BI–II):	5800 to 5000 BC
• Middle (Cucuteni B, Trypillia BII to CI–II):	5000 to 3500 BC
• Late (Horodiștea–Foltești, Trypillia CII):	3500 to 3000 BC

=== Early period (5800–5000 BC) ===
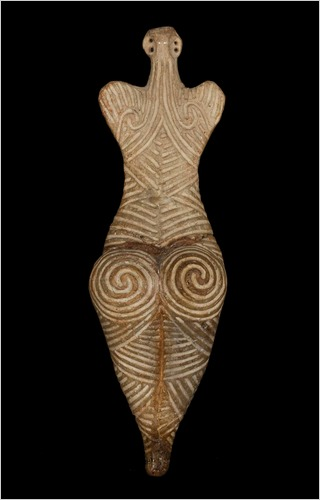
A Goddess figurine, Romania, 4050–3900 BC

The roots of Cucuteni–Trypillia culture can be found in the Starčevo–Körös–Criș and Vinča cultures of the 6th to 5th millennia, with additional influence from the Bug–Dniester culture (6500–5000 BC). During the early period of its existence (in the fifth millennium BC), the Cucuteni–Trypillia culture was also influenced by the Linear Pottery culture from the north, and by the Boian culture from the south.

Through colonisation and acculturation from these other cultures, the formative Pre-Cucuteni/Trypillia A culture was established. Over the course of the fifth millennium, the Cucuteni–Trypillia culture expanded from its 'homeland' in the Prut–Siret region along the eastern foothills of the Carpathian Mountains into the basins and plains of the Dnieper and Southern Bug rivers of central Ukraine.

Settlements also developed in the southeastern stretches of the Carpathian Mountains, with the materials known locally as the Ariușd culture (see also: Prehistory of Transylvania). Most of the settlements were located close to rivers, with fewer settlements located on the plateaus. Most early dwellings took the form of pit-houses, though they were accompanied by an ever-increasing incidence of above-ground clay houses. The floors and hearths of these structures were made of clay, and the walls of clay-plastered wood or reeds. Roofing was made of thatched straw or reeds.

The inhabitants were involved with animal husbandry, agriculture, fishing and gathering. Wheat, rye and peas were grown. Tools included ploughs made of antler, stone, bone and sharpened sticks. The harvest was collected with scythes made of flint-inlaid blades. The grain was milled into flour by quern-stones. Women were involved in pottery, textile- and garment-making, and played a leading role in community life. Men hunted, herded the livestock, made tools from flint, bone and stone.

Of their livestock, cattle were the most important, with swine, sheep and goats playing lesser roles. The question of whether or not the horse was domesticated during this time of the Cucuteni–Trypillia culture is disputed among historians; horse remains have been found in some of their settlements, but it is unclear whether these remains were from wild horses or domesticated ones.

Clay statues of women and amulets have been found dating to this period. Copper items, primarily bracelets, rings and hooks, are occasionally found as well. A hoard of a large number of copper items was discovered in the village of Cărbuna, Moldova, consisting primarily of items of jewelry, which were dated back to the beginning of the fifth millennium BC. Some historians have used this evidence to support the theory that a social stratification was present in early Cucuteni culture, but this is disputed by others.

Pottery remains from this early period are very rarely discovered; the remains that have been found indicate that the ceramics were used after being fired in a kiln. The outer colour of the pottery is a smoky grey, with raised and sunken relief decorations. Toward the end of this early Cucuteni–Trypillia period, the pottery begins to be painted before firing. The white-painting technique found on some of the pottery from this period was imported from the earlier and contemporary (5th millennium) Gumelnița–Karanovo culture. Historians point to this transition to kiln-fired, white-painted pottery as the turning point for when the Pre-Cucuteni culture ended and Cucuteni Phase (or Cucuteni–Trypillia culture) began.

Cucuteni and the neighbouring Gumelnița–Karanovo cultures seem to be largely contemporary; the "Cucuteni A phase seems to be very long (4600–4050) and covers the entire evolution of the Gumelnița–Karanovo A1, A2, B2 phases (maybe 4650–4050)."

=== Middle period (5000–3500 BC) ===
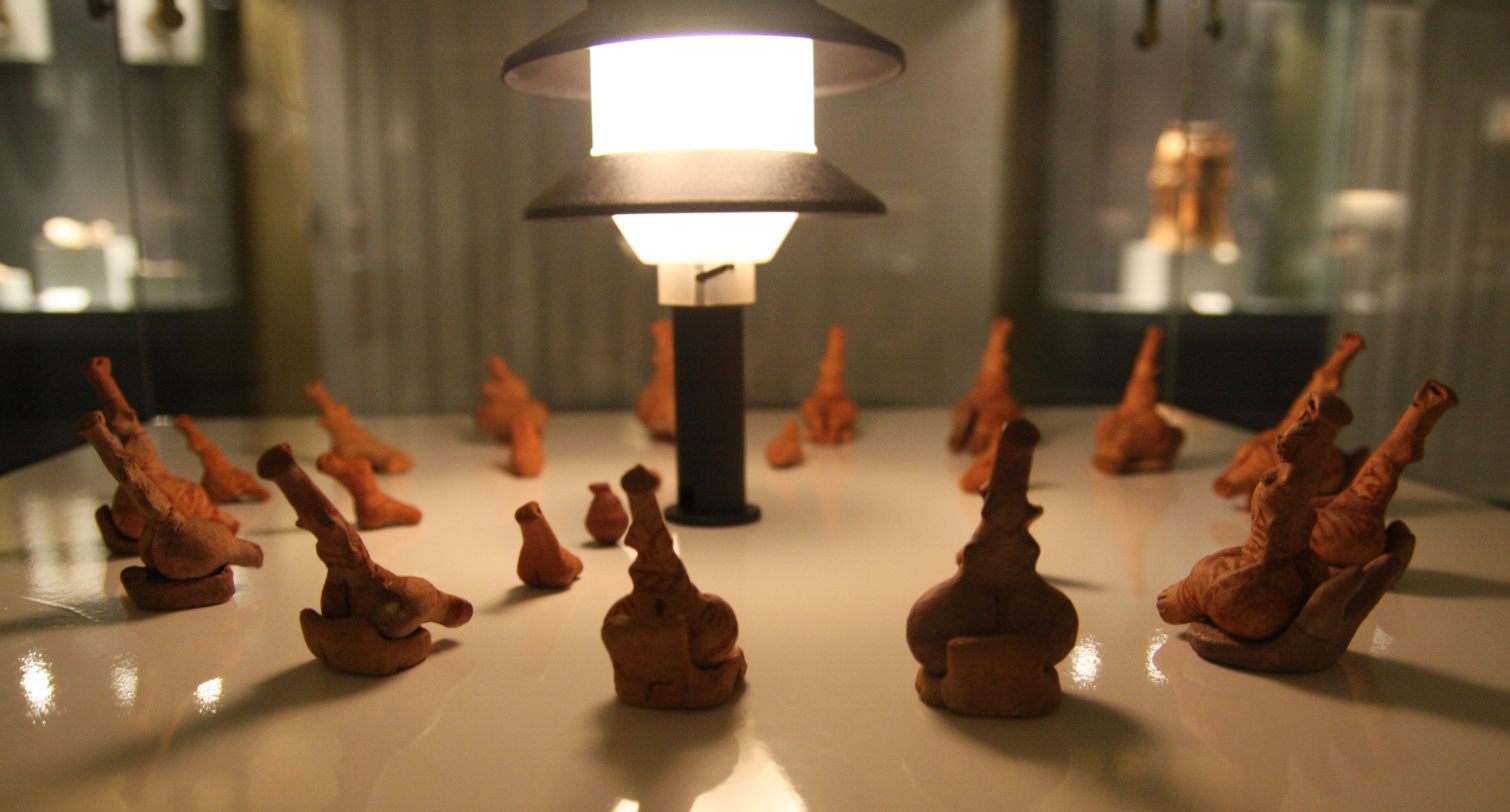
Clay figurines, 4900–4750 BC, discovered in Balta Popii, Romania. Cucuteni Neolithic Art Museum, Piatra-Neamţ, Romania. The "Council of the Goddesses" was discovered consisting of 36 artifacts: 21 anthropomorphic statuettes, 13 thrones, 1 cone and 1 bead.

In the middle era, the Cucuteni–Trypillia culture spread over a wide area from Eastern Transylvania in the west to the Dnieper River in the east. During this period, the population immigrated into and settled along the banks of the upper and middle regions of the Right Bank (or western side) of the Dnieper River, in present-day Ukraine. The population grew considerably during this time, resulting in settlements being established on plateaus, near major rivers and springs.

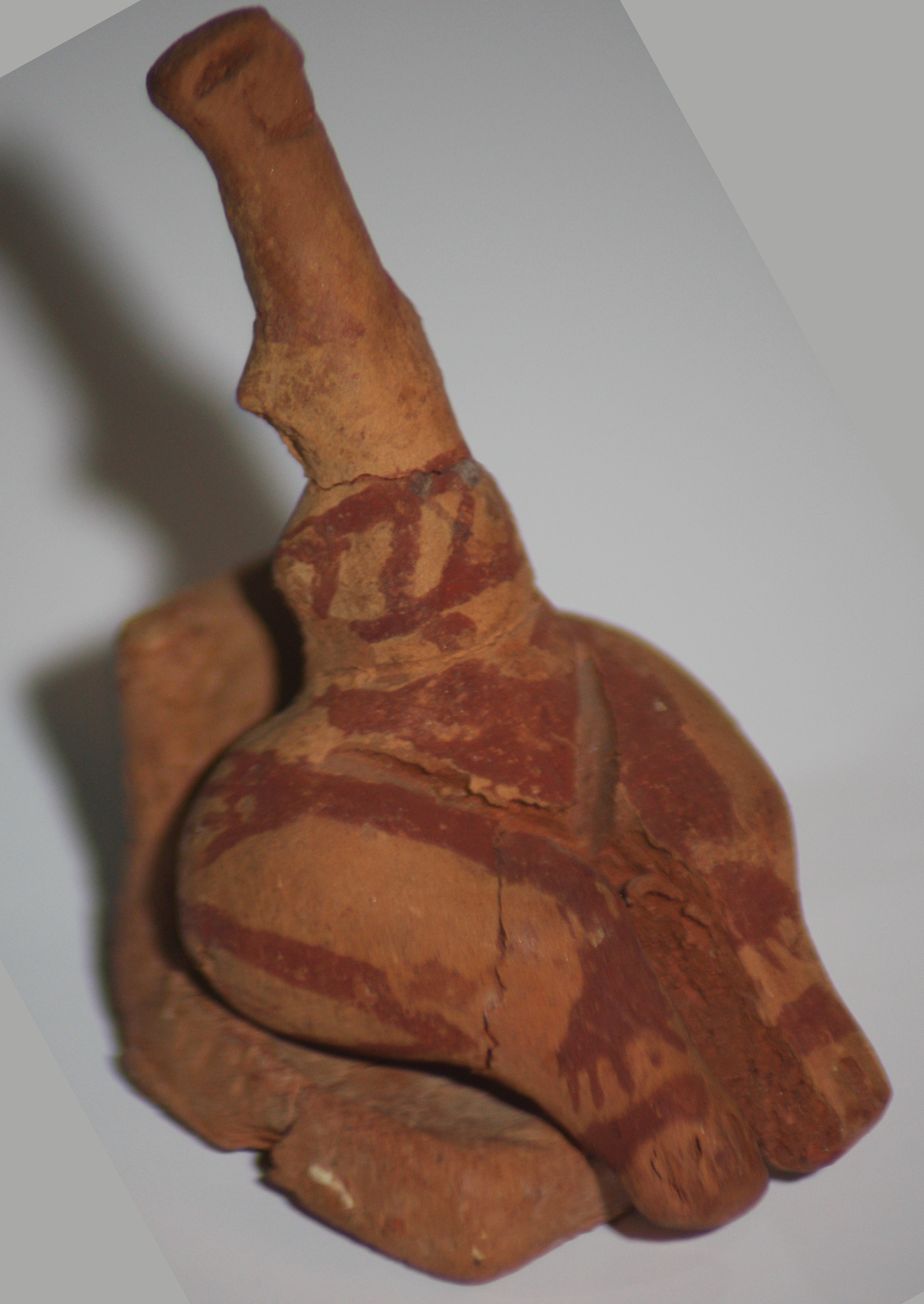
One of the 'Council of the Goddesses'

Their dwellings were built by placing vertical poles in the form of circles or ovals. The construction techniques incorporated log floors covered in clay, wattle-and-daub walls that were woven from pliable branches and covered in clay and a clay oven, which was situated in the centre of the dwelling. As the population in this area grew, more land was put under cultivation. Hunting supplemented the practice of animal husbandry of domestic livestock.

Tools made of flint, rock, clay, wood and bones continued to be used for cultivation and other chores. Much less common than other materials, copper axes and other tools have been discovered that were made from ore mined in Volyn, Ukraine, as well as some deposits along the Dnieper river. Pottery-making by this time had become sophisticated, however they still relied on techniques of making pottery by hand. The potter's wheel was not used yet.

Characteristics of the Cucuteni–Trypillia pottery included a monochromic spiral design, painted with black paint on a yellow and red base. Large pear-shaped pottery for the storage of grain, dining plates and other goods, was also prevalent. Ceramic statues of female "goddess" figures, as well as figurines of animals and models of houses dating to this period have also been discovered.

Some scholars have used the abundance of these clay female fetish statues to base the theory that this culture was matriarchal in nature. It was partially the archaeological evidence from Cucuteni–Trypillia culture that inspired Marija Gimbutas, Joseph Campbell and some latter 20th century feminists to set forth the popular theory of an Old European culture of peaceful, egalitarian (counter to a widespread misconception, "matristic" not matriarchal), goddess-centred neolithic European societies that were wiped out by patriarchal, Sky Father-worshipping, warlike, Bronze-Age Proto-Indo-European tribes that swept out of the steppes north and east of the Black Sea.

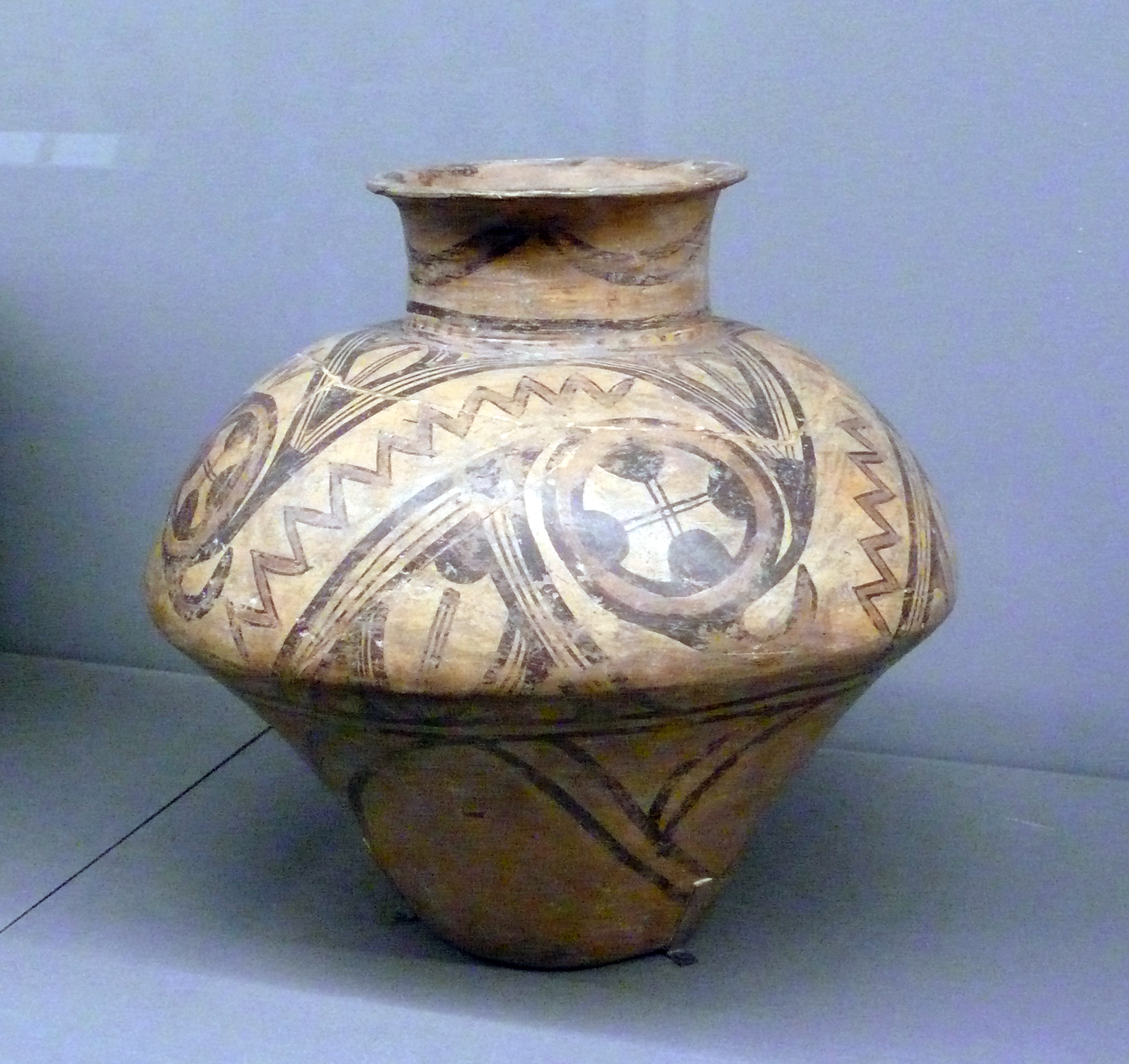
Pottery, Romania, 3700-3500 BC

=== Late period (3500–3000 BC) ===
During the late period, the Cucuteni–Trypillia territory expanded to include the Volyn region in northwest Ukraine, the Sluch and Horyn Rivers in northern Ukraine and along both banks of the Dnipro river near Kyiv. Members of the Cucuteni–Trypillia culture who lived along the coastal regions near the Black Sea came into contact with other cultures. Animal husbandry increased in importance, as hunting diminished. Horses also became more important.

Outlying communities were established on the Don and Volga rivers in present-day Russia. Dwellings were constructed differently from previous periods, and a new rope-like design replaced the older spiral-patterned designs on the pottery. Different forms of ritual burial were developed where the deceased were interred in the ground with elaborate burial rituals. An increasingly larger number of Bronze Age artefacts originating from other lands were found as the end of the Cucuteni–Trypillia culture drew near.

=== Decline and end ===
There is a debate among scholars regarding how the end of the Cucuteni–Trypillia culture took place.

According to some proponents of the Kurgan hypothesis of the origin of Proto-Indo-Europeans, and in particular the archaeologist Marija Gimbutas, in her 1961 article "Notes on the chronology and expansion of the Pit-grave culture", later expanded by her and others, the Cucuteni–Trypillia culture was destroyed by force. Arguing from archaeological and linguistic evidence, Gimbutas concluded that the people of the Kurgan culture, a term grouping the Yamnaya culture and its predecessors of the Pontic–Caspian steppe, being most likely speakers of the Proto-Indo-European language, effectively destroyed the Cucuteni–Trypillia culture in a series of invasions undertaken during their expansion to the west.

Based on this archaeological evidence, Gimbutas saw distinct cultural differences between the patriarchal, warlike Kurgan culture and the more peaceful egalitarian Cucuteni–Trypillia culture, which she argued was a significant component of the "Old European cultures" which finally met extinction in a process visible in the progressing appearance of fortified settlements, hillforts and the graves of warrior-chieftains, and in the religious transformation from the matriarchy to patriarchy, in a correlated east–west movement.

In this, "the process of Indo-Europeanization was a cultural, not a physical, transformation and must be understood as a military victory in terms of successfully imposing a new administrative system, language, and religion upon the indigenous groups. These proponents of the Kurgan hypothesis hold that this invasion took place during the third wave of Kurgan expansion between 3000–2800 BC, permanently ending the Cucuteni–Trypillia culture. The theory "may find corroboration in the frequent evidence of violent death discovered in Verteba cave".

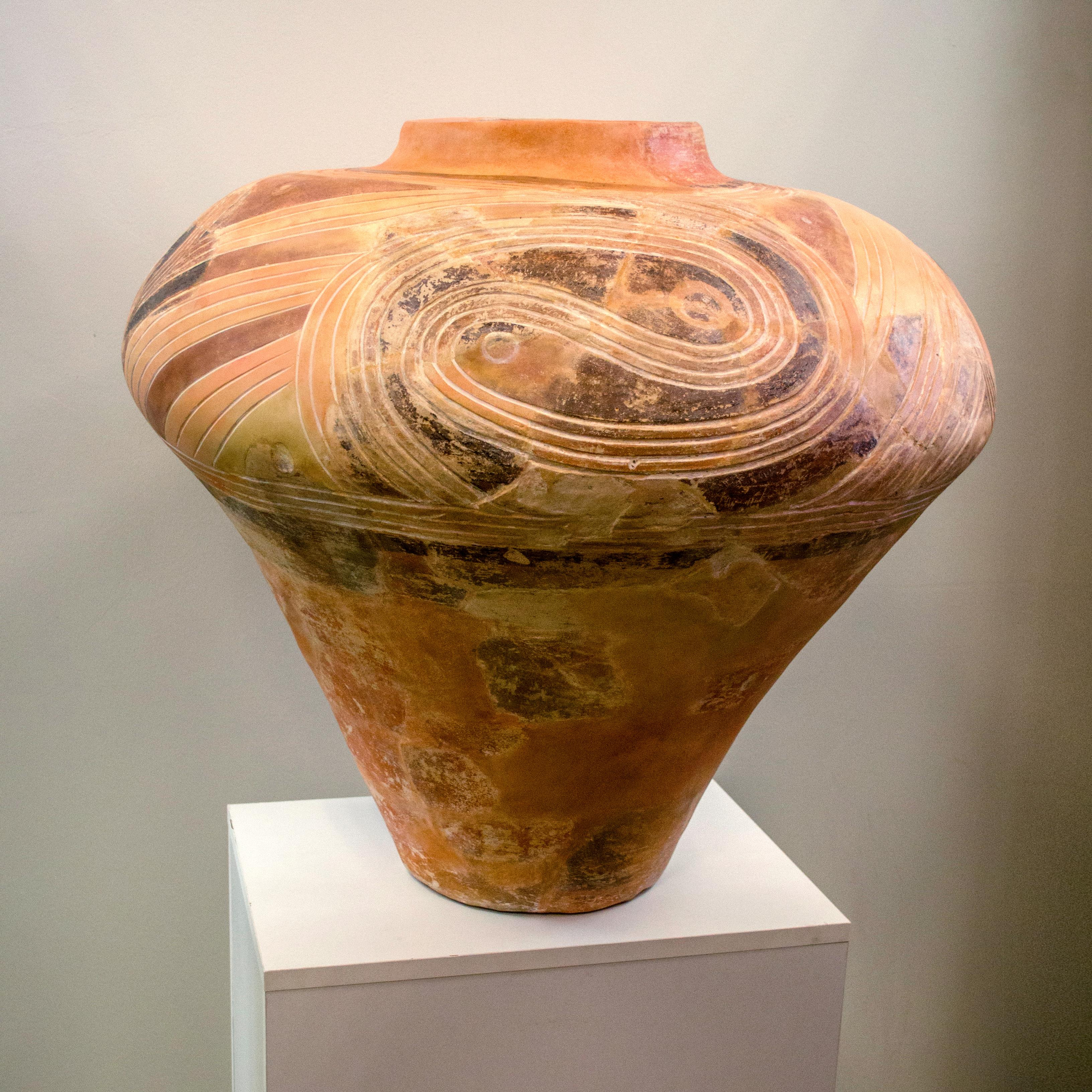
A Cucuteni-Trypillia ceramic vessel, at the National Museum of the History of Ukraine, Kyiv, Ukraine

In his 1989 book In Search of the Indo-Europeans, Irish-American archaeologist J. P. Mallory, summarising the three existing theories concerning the end of the Cucuteni–Trypillia culture, mentions that archaeological findings in the region indicate Kurgan (i.e., Yamnaya culture) settlements in the eastern part of the Cucuteni–Trypillia area, co-existing for some time with those of the Cucuteni–Trypillia. Artifacts from both cultures found within each of their respective archaeological settlement sites attest to an open trade in goods for a period. He points out that the archaeological evidence clearly points to what he termed "a dark age," its population seeking refuge in every direction except east.

Mallory cites evidence of the refugees having used caves, islands and hilltops, abandoning in the process 600–700 settlements, to argue for the possibility of a gradual transformation rather than an armed onslaught bringing about cultural extinction. The potential issue with that theory is the limited common historical life-time between the Cucuteni–Trypillia (4800–2750 BC) and the Yamnaya culture (3300–2600 BC). At the same time, genetic analyses of Trypillian remains from the CII period of Trypillian chronology indicate a substantial presence of the so-called "steppe" genetic ancestry that characterizes representatives of the Yamna culture complex.

Another potential contradicting indication is that the kurgans that replaced the traditional horizontal graves in the area now contain human remains of a fairly diversified skeletal type approximately ten centimeters taller on average than the previous population. At the same time, some Eneolithic steppe burials from the northwest Pontic region already displayed rather tall stature hundreds of years before the emergence of the Yamna culture complex.

In the 1990s and 2000s, another theory regarding the end of the Cucuteni–Trypillia culture emerged based on climatic change that took place at the end of their culture's existence, known as the Blytt–Sernander Sub-Boreal phase. Beginning around 3200 BC, the Earth's climate became colder and drier than it had ever been since the end of the last Ice age, resulting in the worst drought in the history of Europe since the beginning of agriculture. The Cucuteni–Trypillia culture relied primarily on farming, which would have collapsed under these climatic conditions in a scenario similar to the Dust Bowl of the American Midwest in the 1930s. According to The American Geographical Union,

The transition to today's arid climate was not gradual, but occurred in two specific episodes. The first, which was less severe, occurred between 6,700 and 5,500 years ago. The second, which was brutal, lasted from 4,000 to 3,600 years ago. Summer temperatures increased sharply, and precipitation decreased, according to carbon-14 dating. According to that theory, the neighboring Yamnaya culture people were pastoralists, and were able to maintain their survival much more effectively in drought conditions. This has led some scholars to come to the conclusion that the Cucuteni–Trypillia culture ended not violently, but as a matter of survival, converting their economy from agriculture to pastoralism, and becoming integrated into the Yamnaya culture.

However, the Blytt–Sernander approach as a way to identify stages of technology in Europe with specific climate periods is an oversimplification not generally accepted. A conflict with that theoretical possibility is that during the warm Atlantic period, Denmark was occupied by Mesolithic cultures, rather than Neolithic, notwithstanding the climatic evidence. The technology stages varied widely globally. To this must be added that the first period of the climate transformation ended 500 years before the end of the Cucuteni–Trypillia culture, and the second approximately 1,400 years after.

== Economy ==
A wheeled bull figurine from the Cucuteni-Tripolye culture of western Ukraine, c 3950-3650 BCE. "The earliest known example of an object on wheels."

Throughout the 2,750 years of its existence, the Cucuteni–Trypillia culture was fairly stable and static; however, there were changes that took place. This article addresses some of these changes that have to do with the economic aspects. These include the basic economic conditions of the culture, the development of trade, interaction with other cultures and the apparent use of barter tokens, an early form of money.

Members of the Cucuteni–Trypillia culture shared common features with other Neolithic societies, including:

- Almost nonexistent social stratification
- Lack of a political elite
- Rudimentary economy, most likely a subsistence or gift economy
- Pastoralists and subsistence farmers

Earlier societies of hunter-gatherer tribes had no social stratification, and later societies of the Bronze Age had noticeable social stratification, which saw the creation of occupational specialization, the state and social classes of individuals who were of the elite ruling or religious classes, full-time warriors and wealthy merchants, contrasted with those individuals on the other end of the economic spectrum who were poor, enslaved and hungry.

In between these two economic models, the hunter-gatherer tribes and Bronze Age civilisations, we find the later Neolithic and Eneolithic societies such as the Cucuteni–Trypillia culture, where the first indications of social stratification began to be found. It would be a mistake to overemphasise the impact of social stratification in the Cucuteni–Trypillia culture, since it was still (even in its later phases) very much an egalitarian society. Social stratification was just one of the many aspects of what is regarded as a fully established civilised society, which began to appear in the Bronze Age.

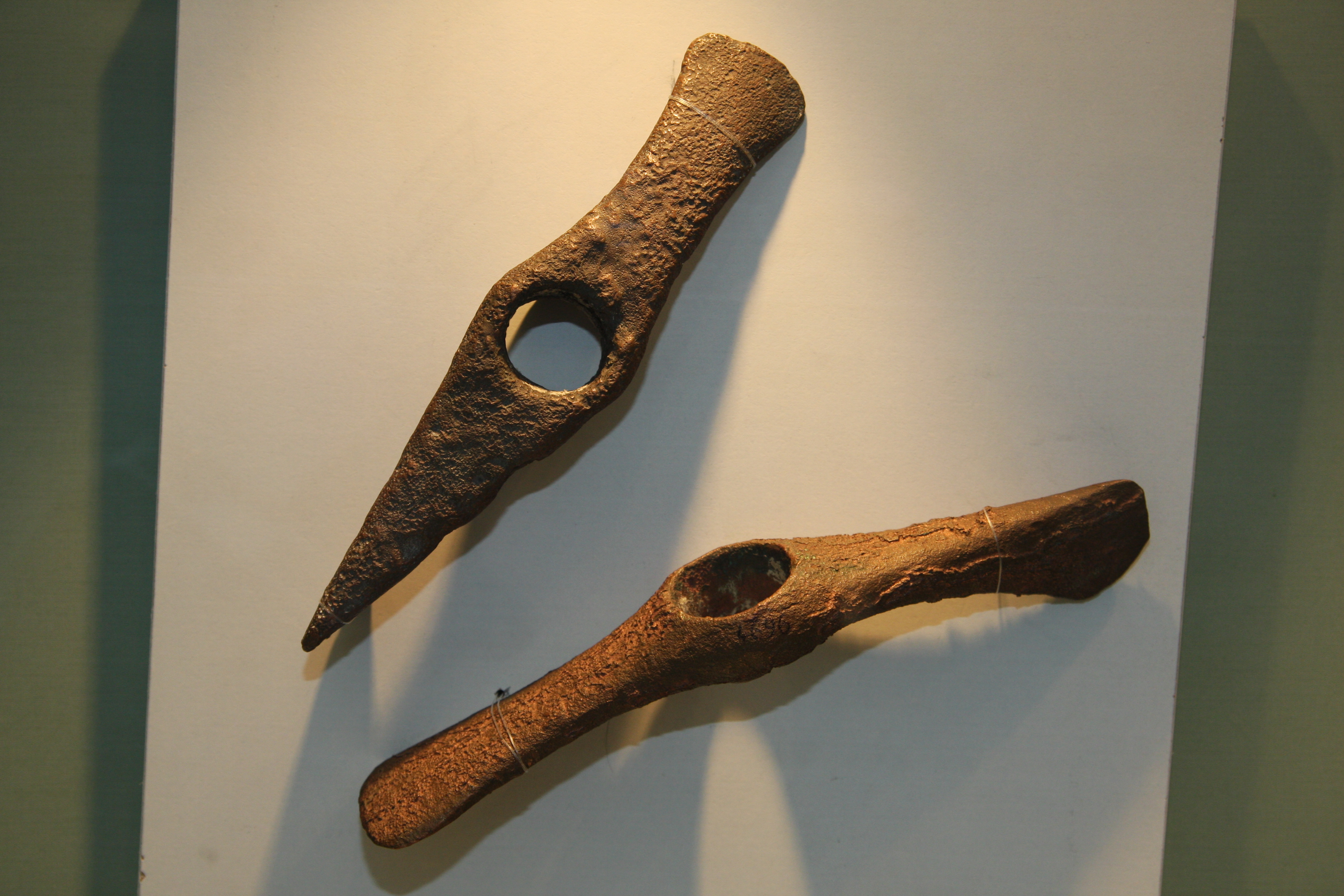
Copper tools

Like other Neolithic societies, the Cucuteni–Trypillia culture had almost no division of labor. Although this culture's settlements sometimes grew to become the largest on Earth at the time, up to 15,000 people in the largest, there is no evidence of labour specialisation. Every household probably had members of the extended family who would work in the fields to raise crops, go to the woods to hunt game and bring back firewood, work by the river to bring back clay or fish and all of the other duties that would be needed to survive.

Contrary to popular belief, the Neolithic people experienced considerable abundance of food and other resources. A 2023 study by scientists from the Collaborative Research Centre (CRC 1266) at Kiel University showed that, based on the isotopic composition of bones and plants, cattle were intensively pastured to provide manure for the growing of pulses.

Each household was mostly self-sufficient and there was very little need for trade. There were certain mineral resources that, because of limitations due to distance and prevalence, formed the rudimentary foundation for a trade network that towards the end of the culture began to develop into a more complex system, as is attested to by an increasing number of artifacts from other cultures that have been dated to the latter period.

Toward the end of the Cucuteni–Trypillia culture's existence, from roughly 3000 BC to 2750 BC, copper traded from other societies, notably, from the Balkans, began to appear throughout the region, and members of the Cucuteni–Trypillia culture began to acquire skills necessary to use it to create various items. Along with the raw copper ore, finished copper tools, hunting weapons and other artefacts were also brought in from other cultures. This marked the transition from the Neolithic to the Eneolithic, also known as the Chalcolithic or Copper Age. Bronze artifacts began to show up in archaeological sites toward the very end of the culture. The primitive trade network of this society, that had been slowly growing more complex, was supplanted by the more complex trade network of the Proto-Indo-European culture that eventually replaced the Cucuteni–Trypillia culture.

The inhabitants of the mega-sites grew crops that could survive in the forest steppe, an area where it is often very dry. It is suggested that the large number of people living in these mega-sites changed the landscape, moving from woodlands and forests to grasslands and steppes. Maybe the Trypillia way of cultivation facilitated the development of the cultural steppe that we see today in this region.

=== Gallery ===
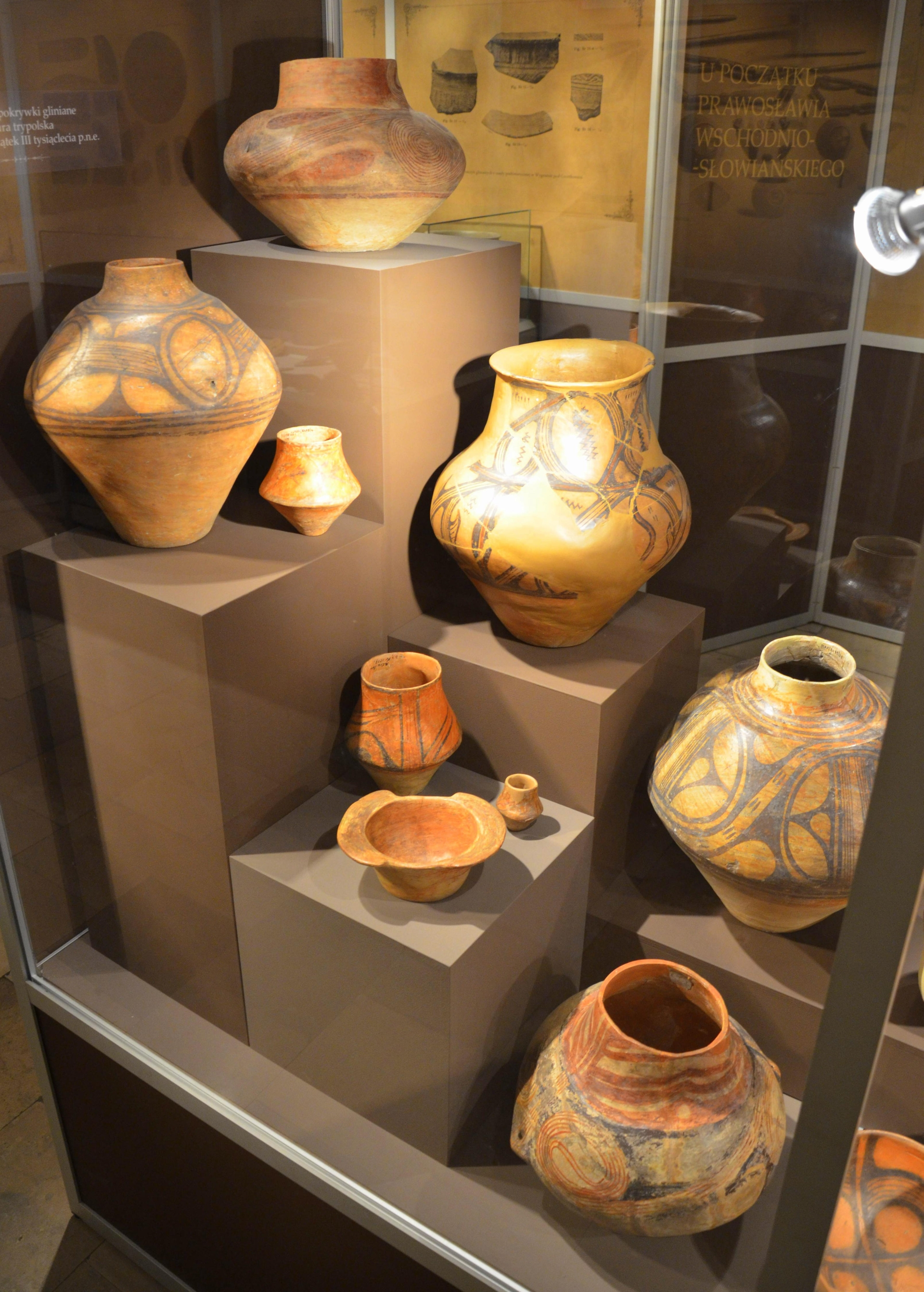

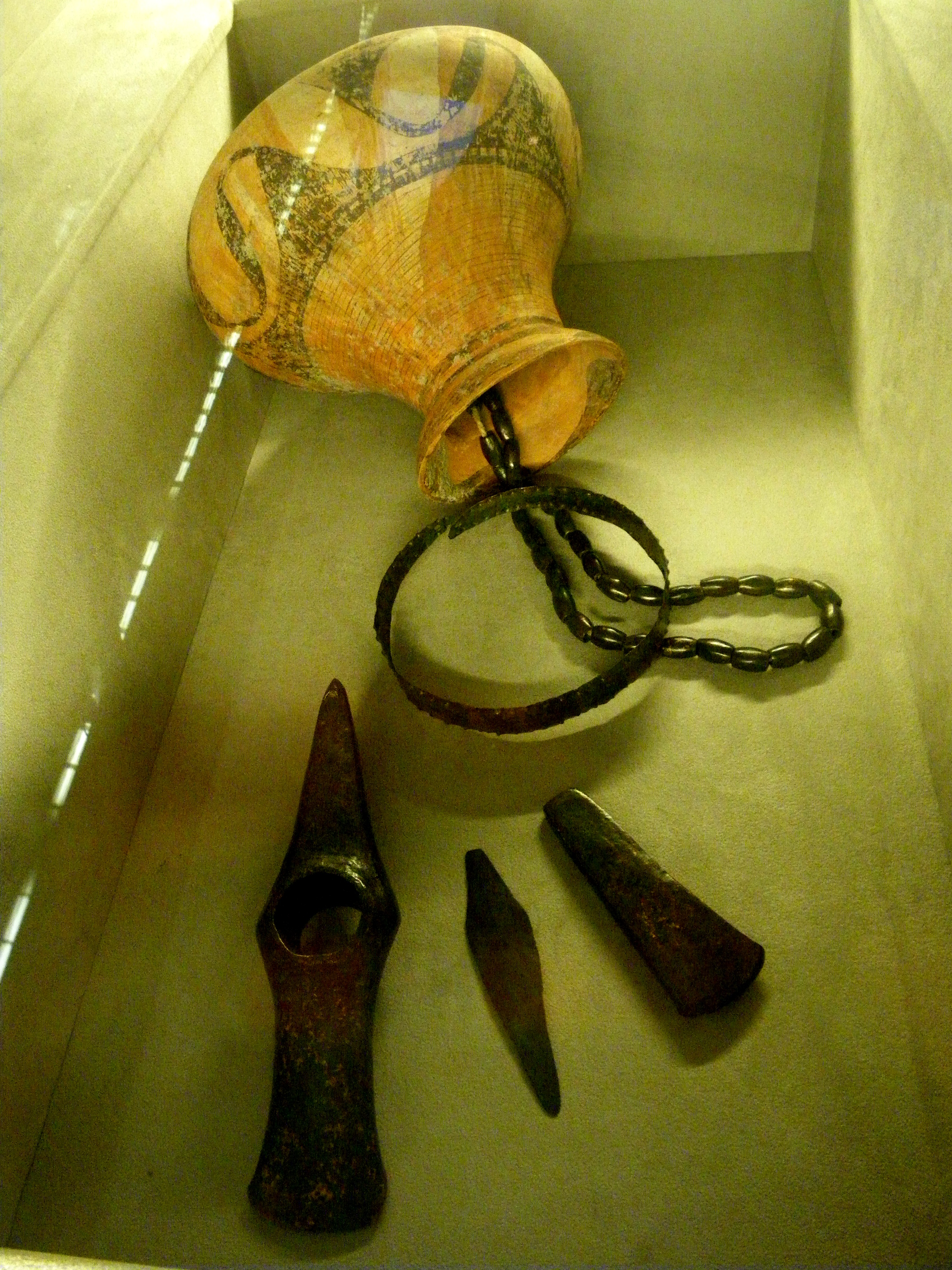
Copper hoard, 4000 BC

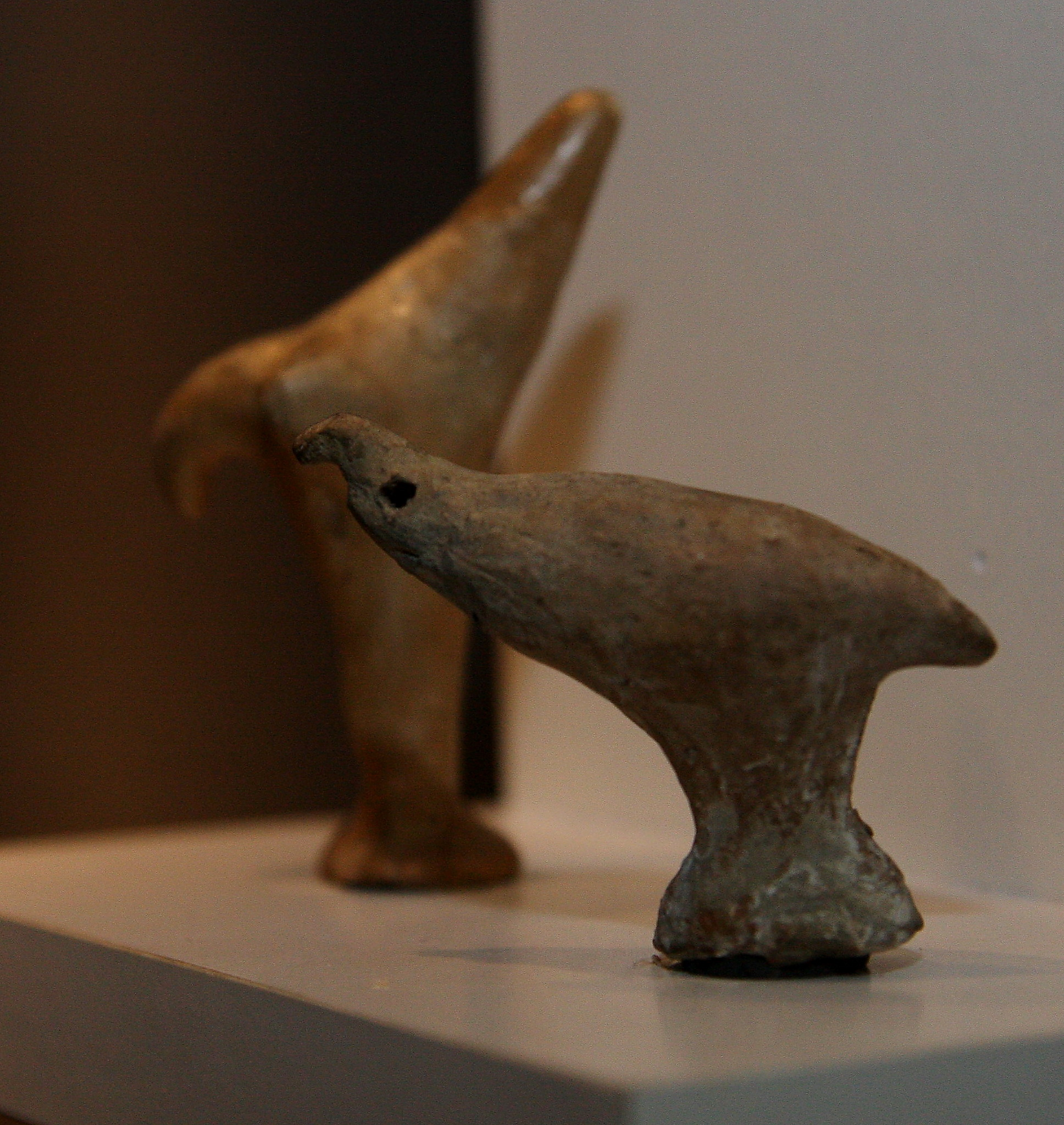

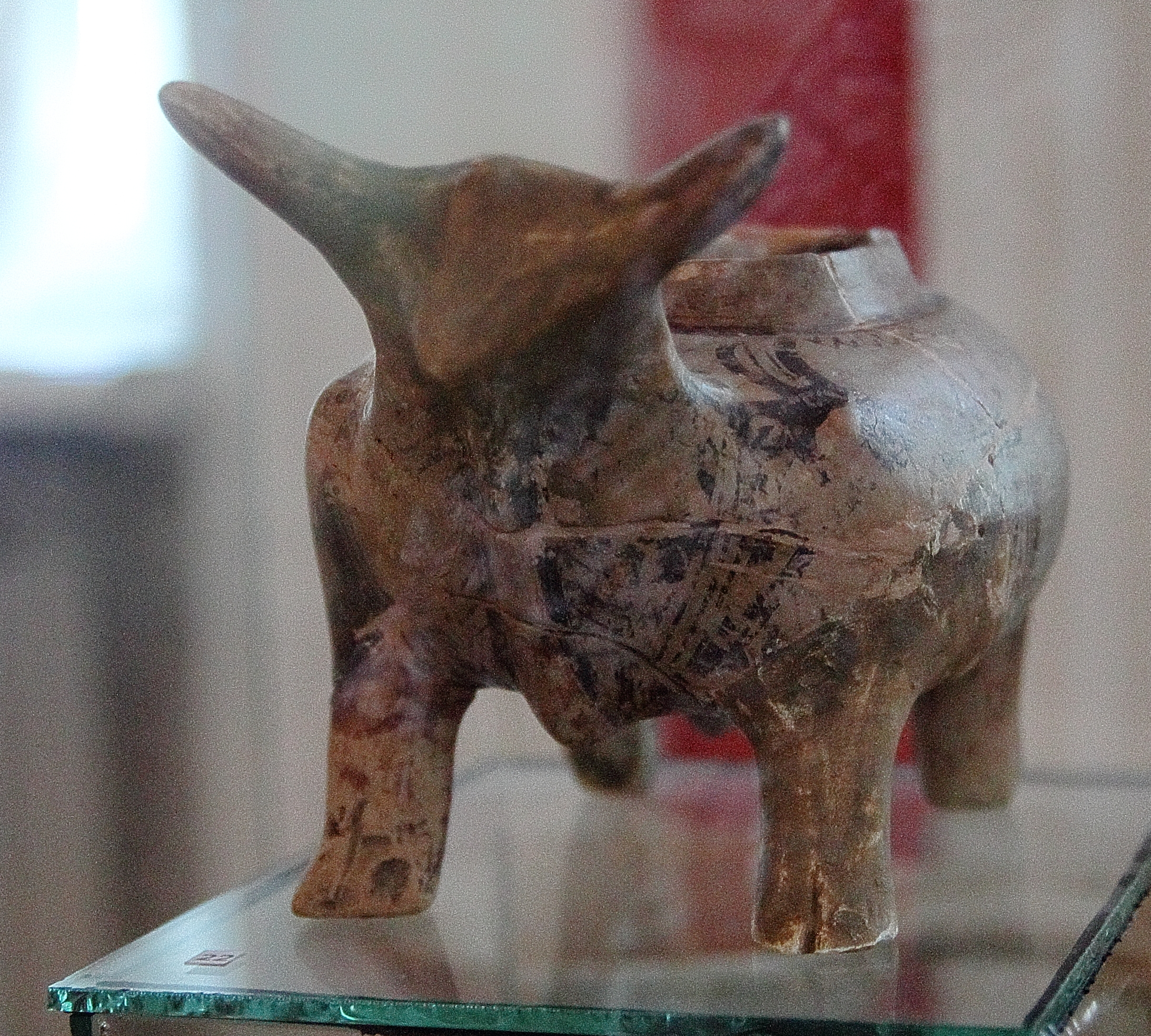

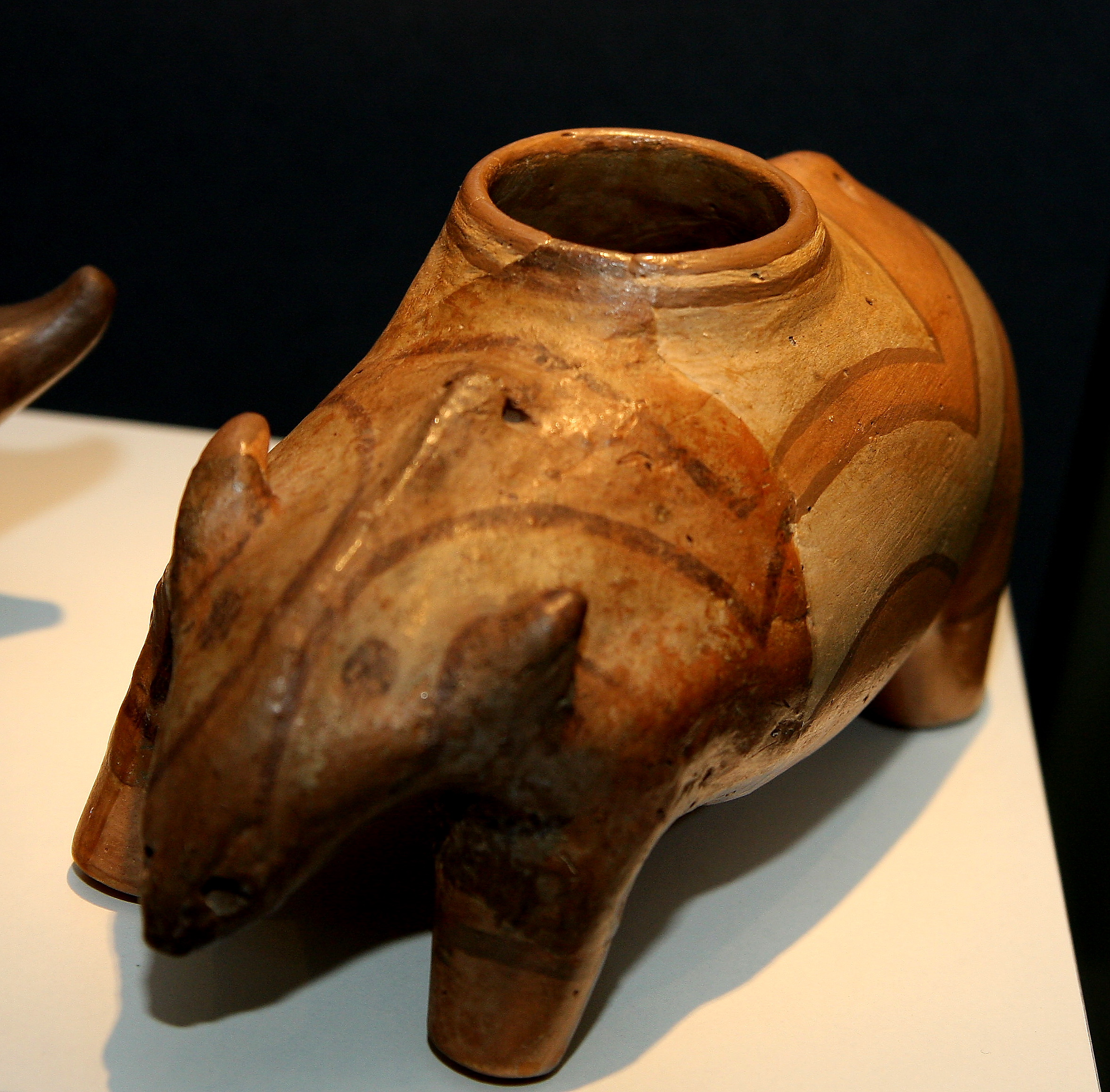

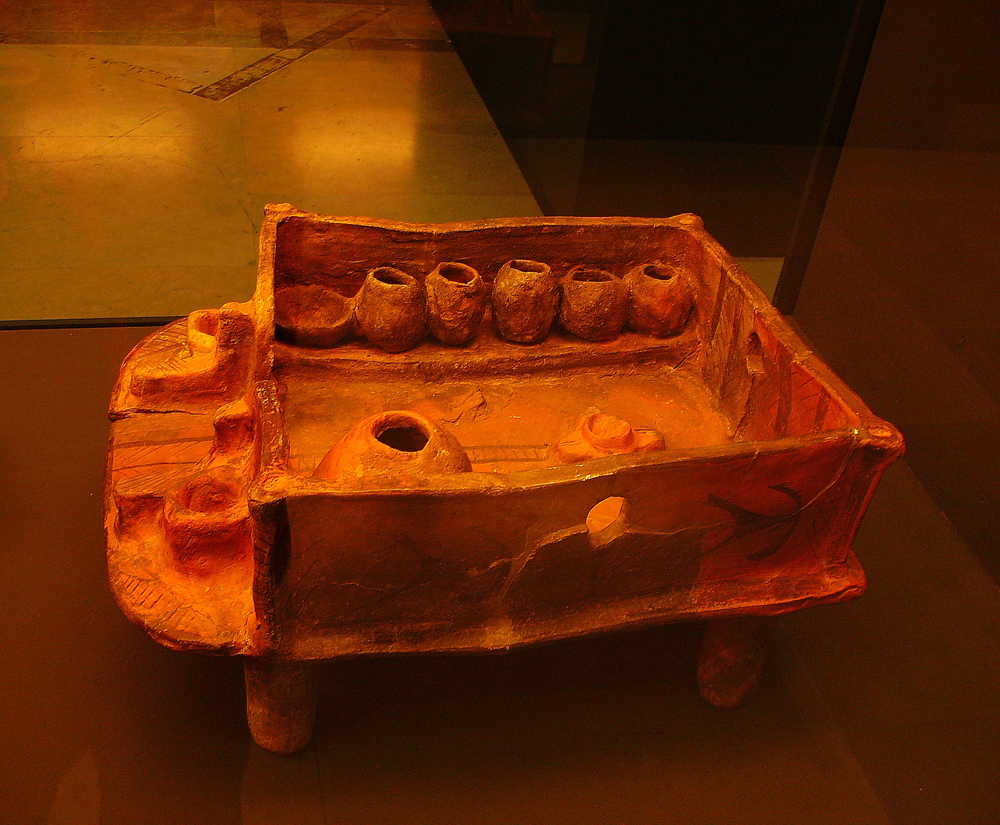

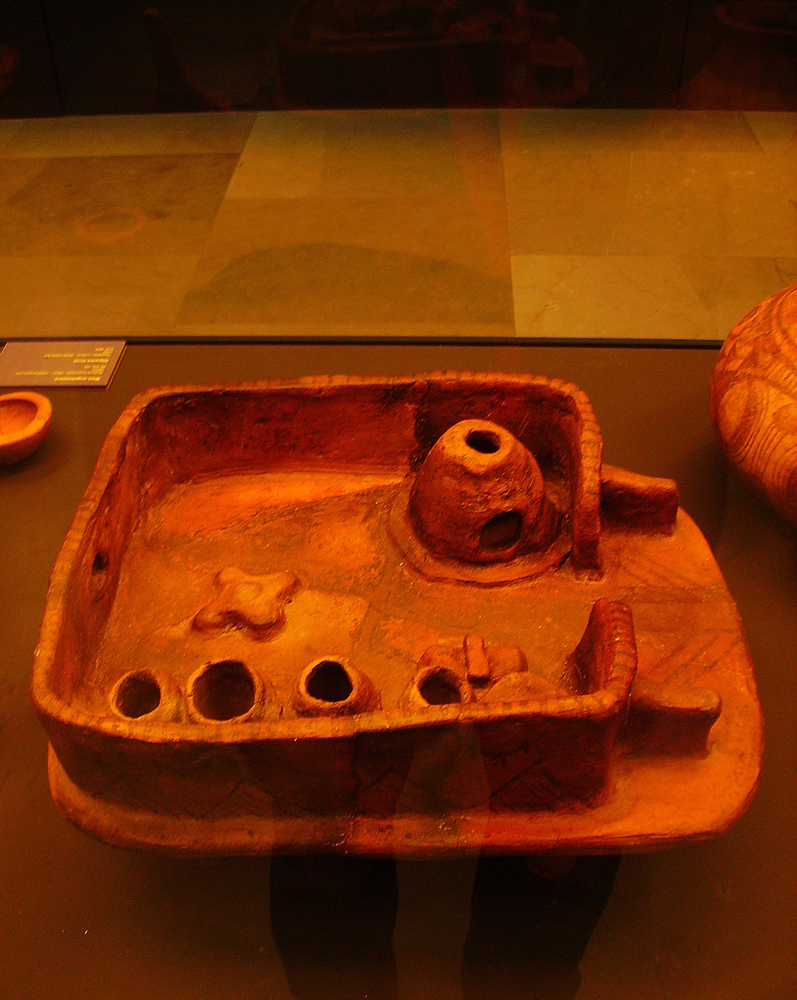

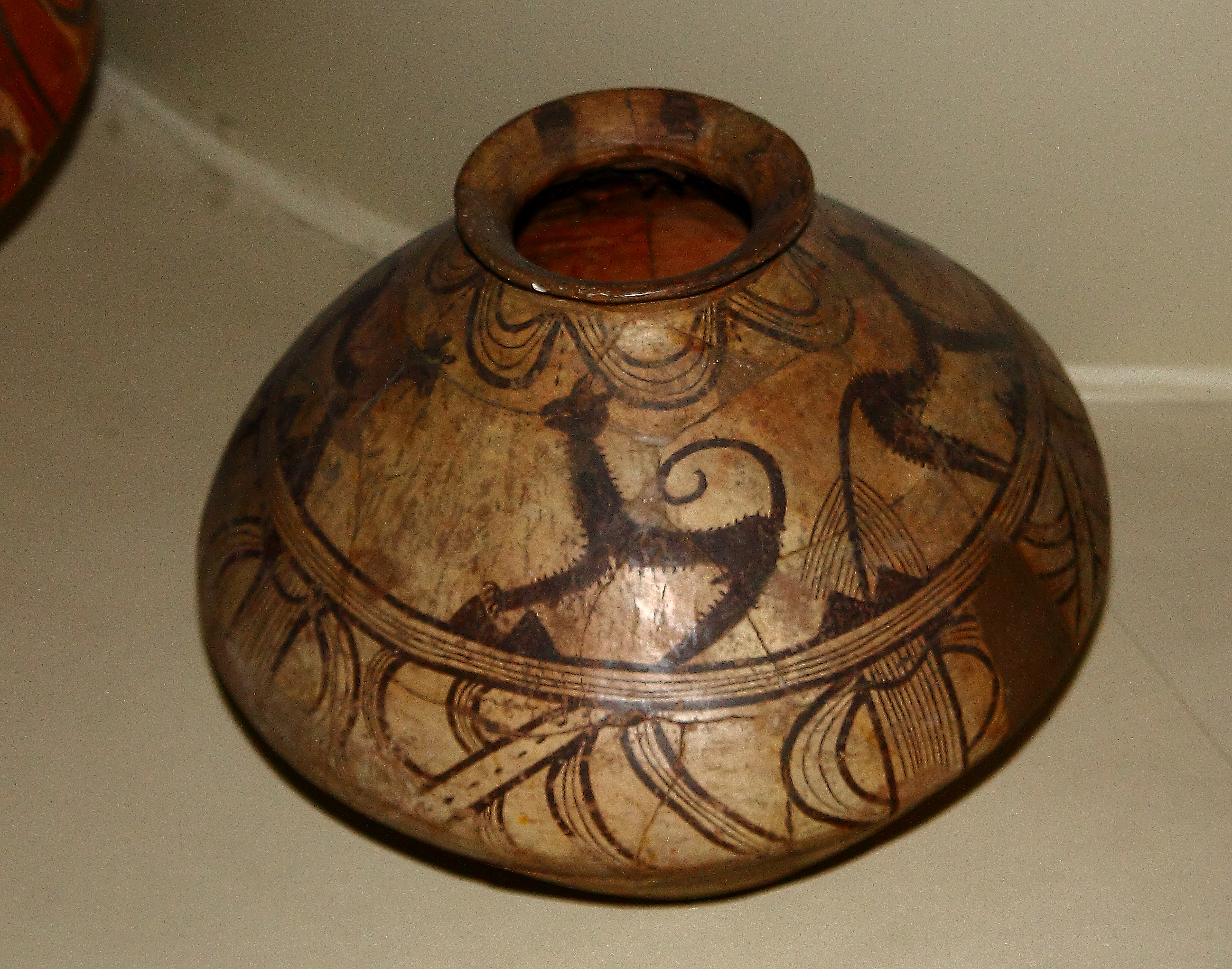

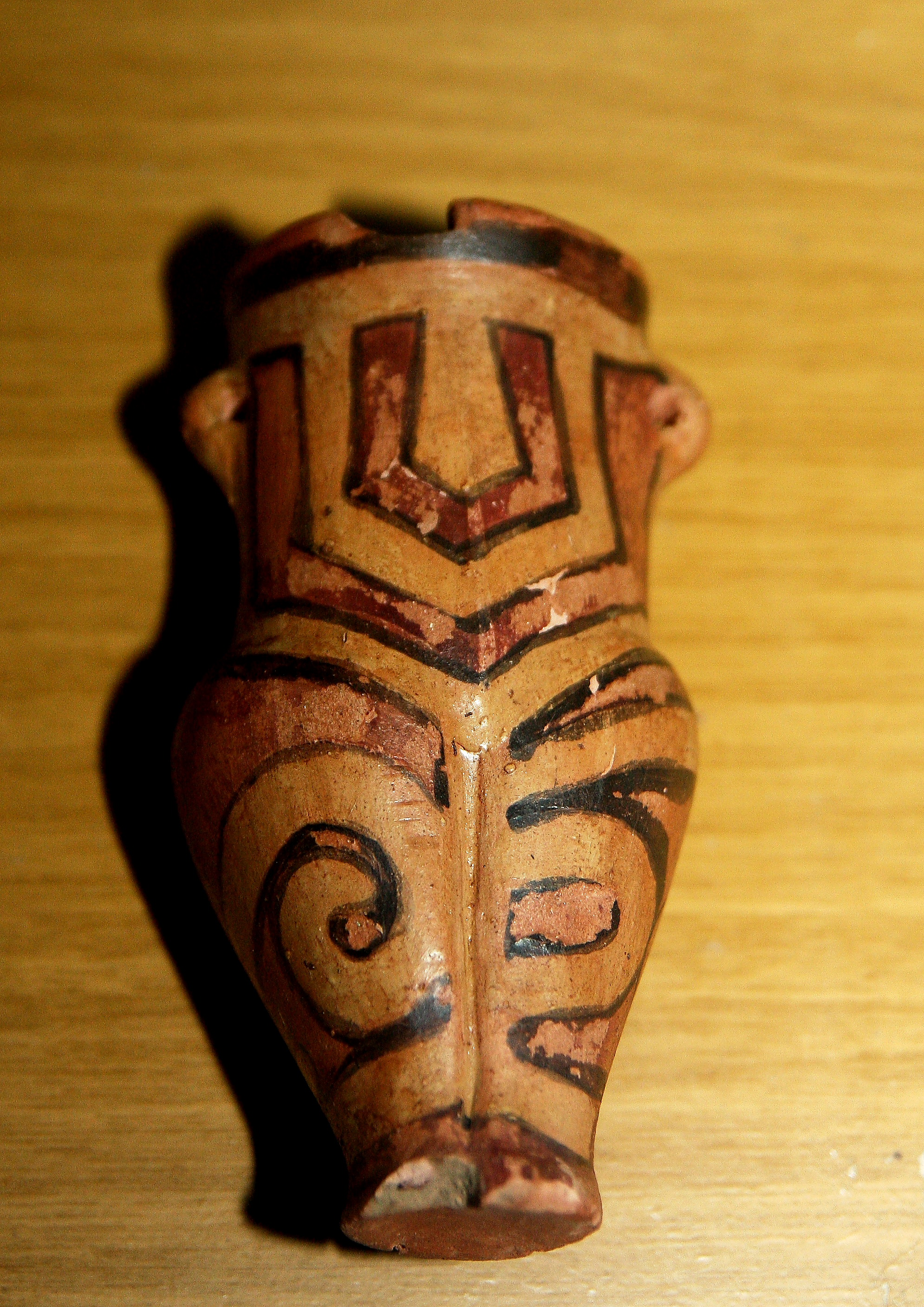

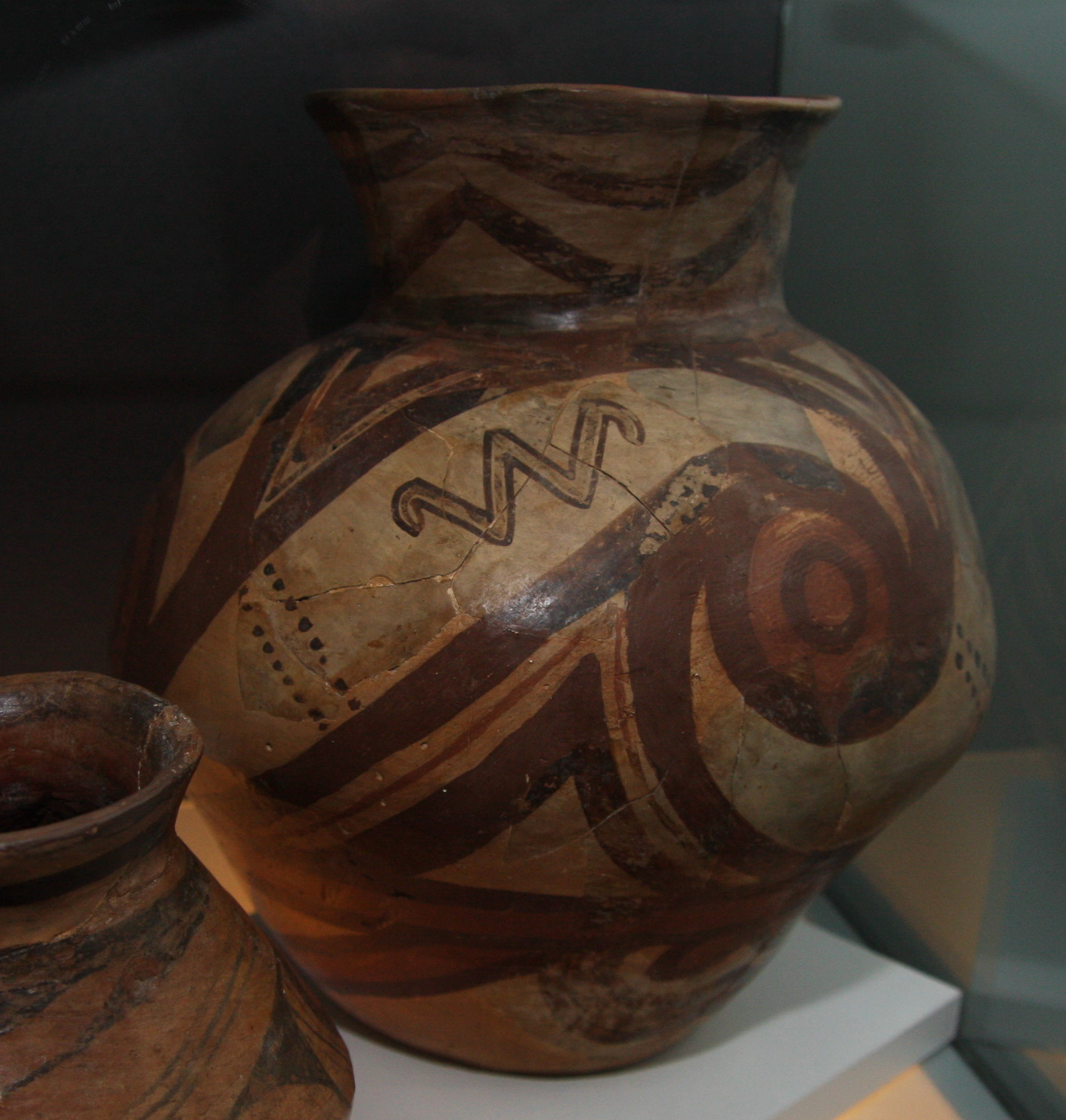

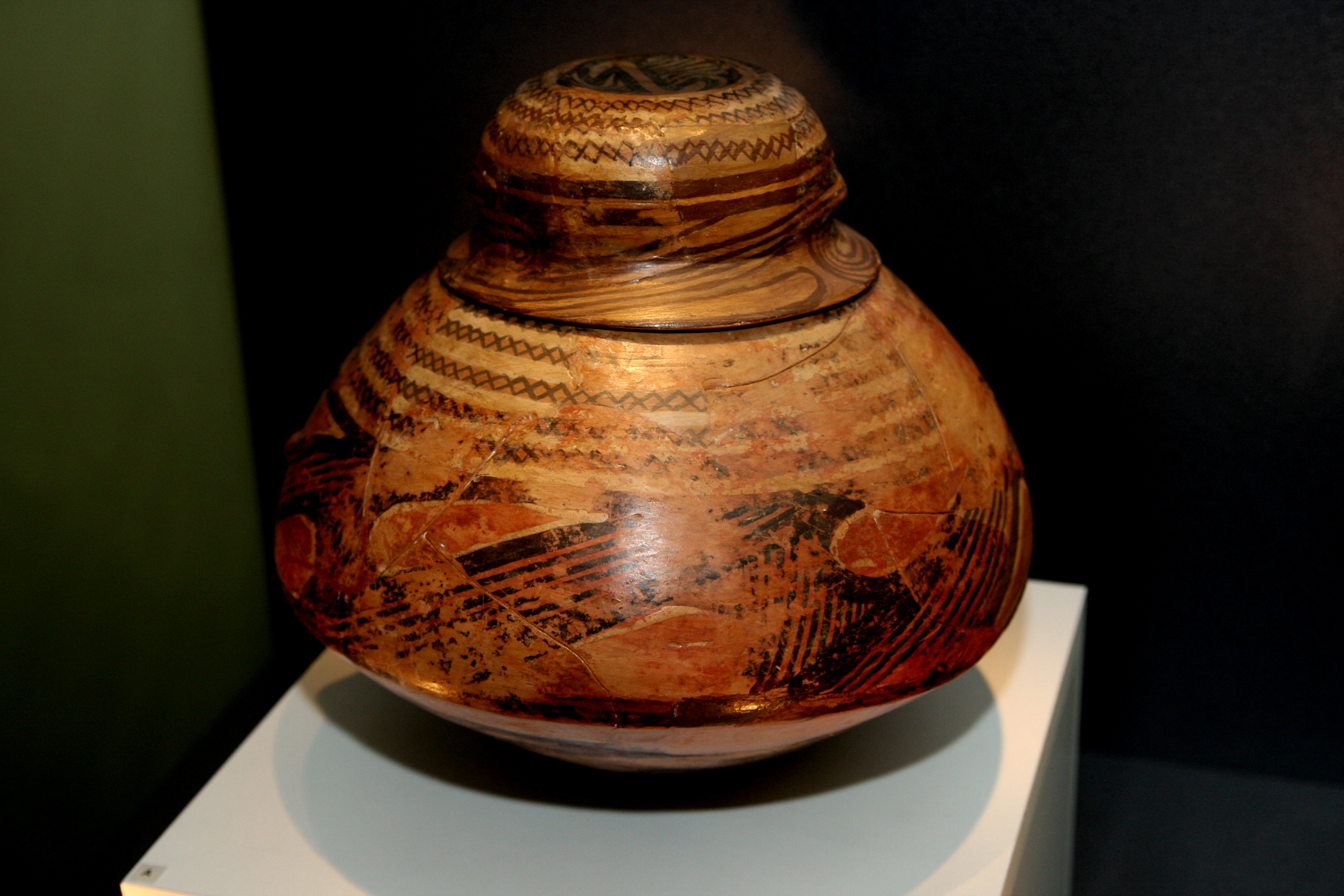

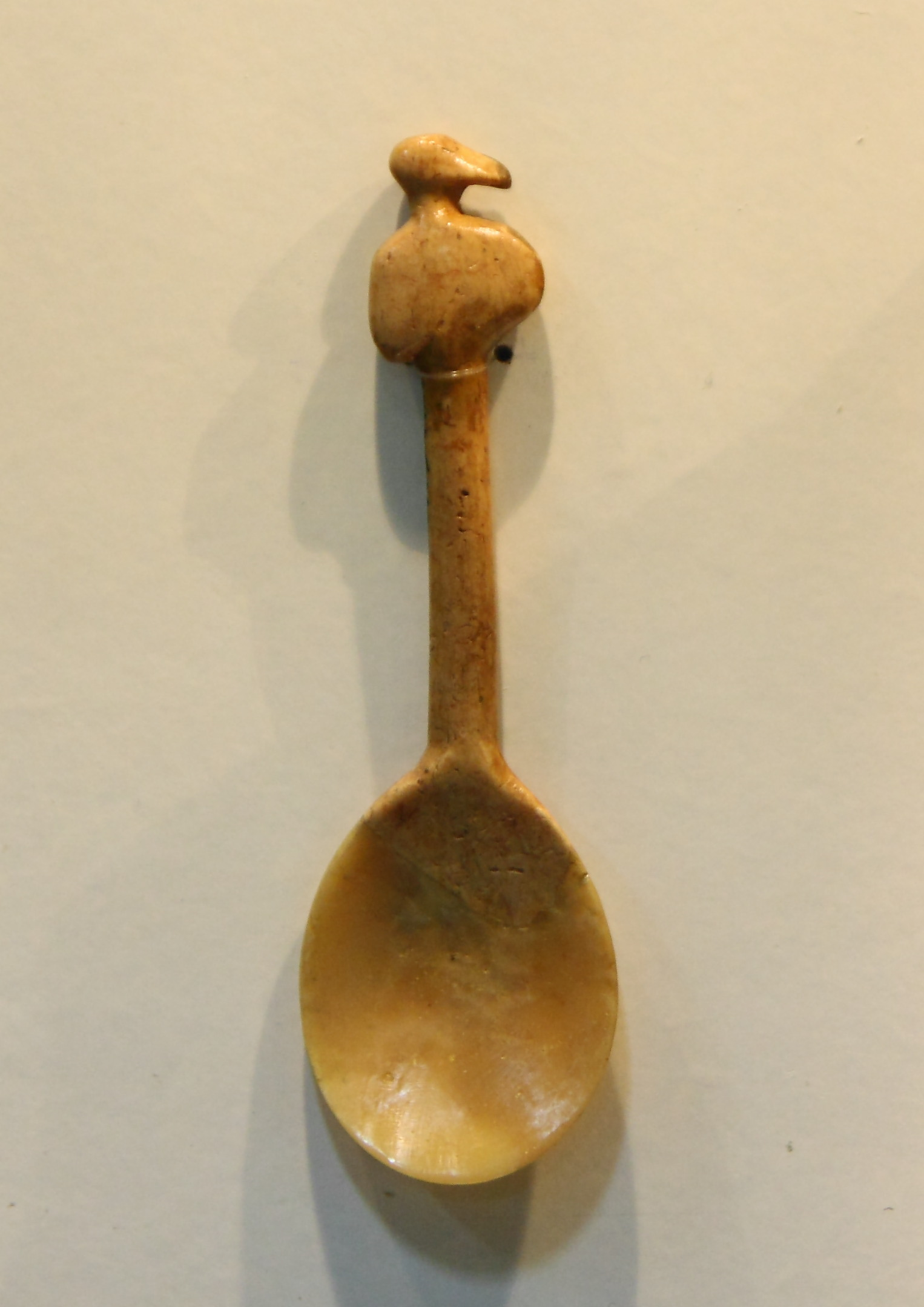

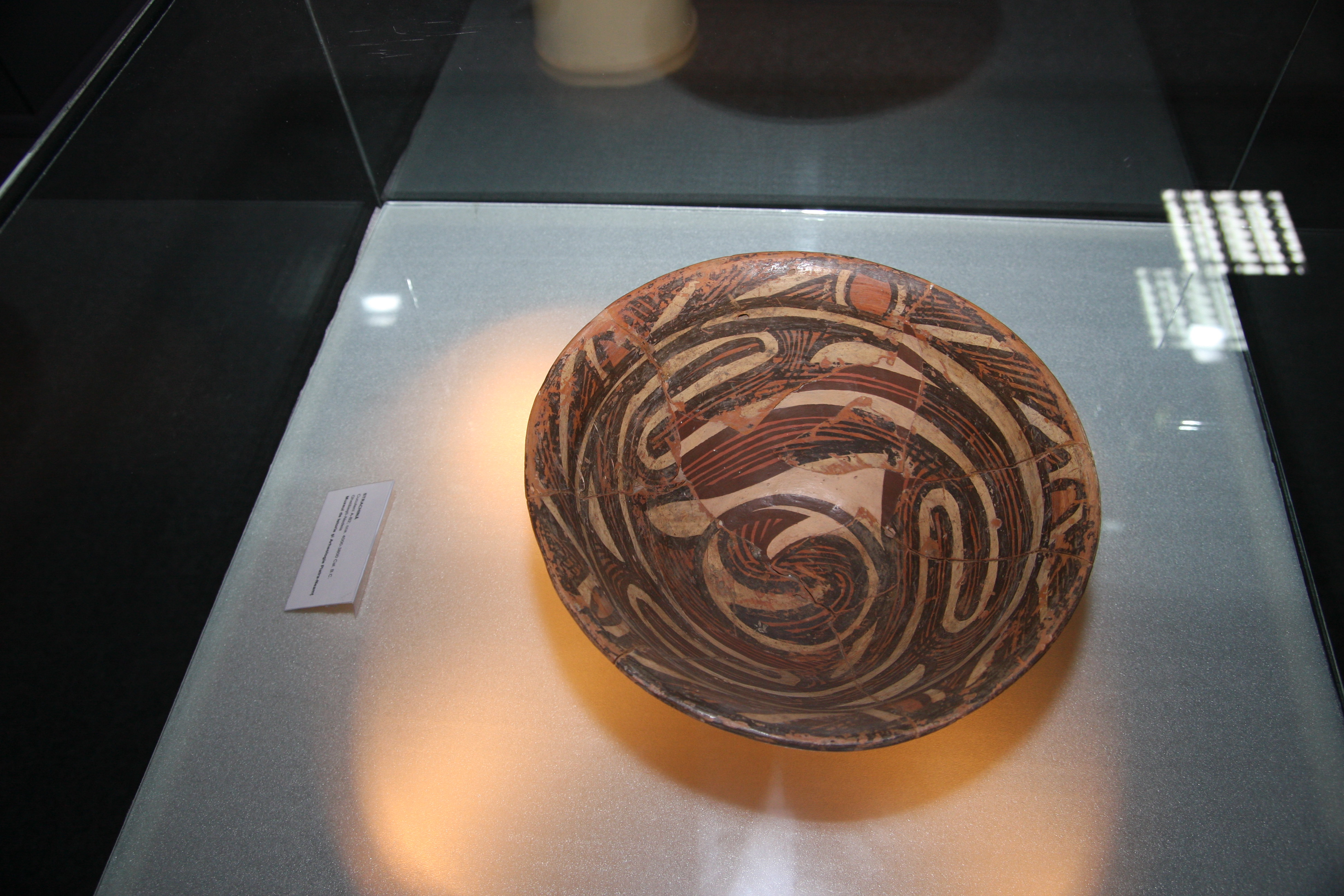

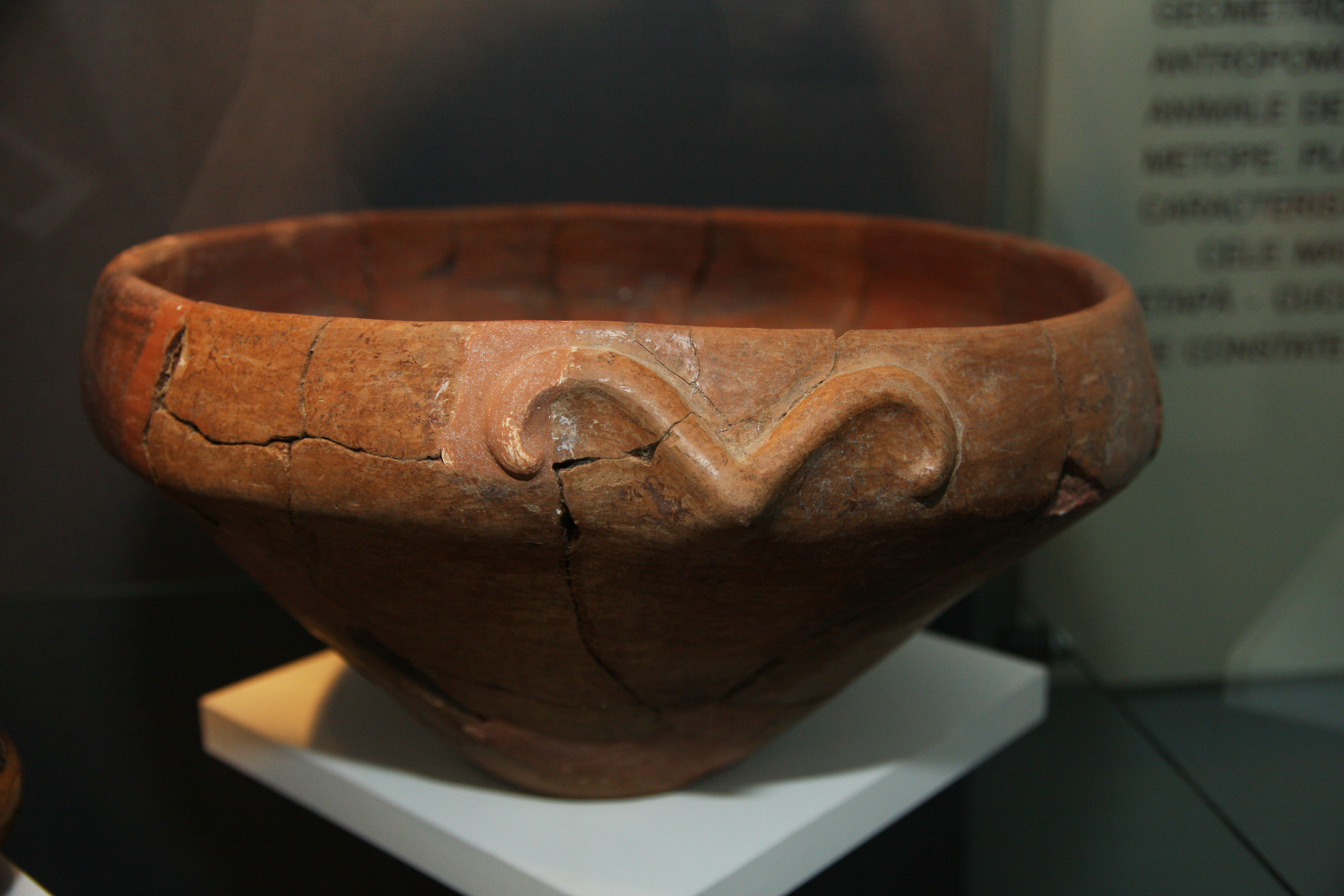

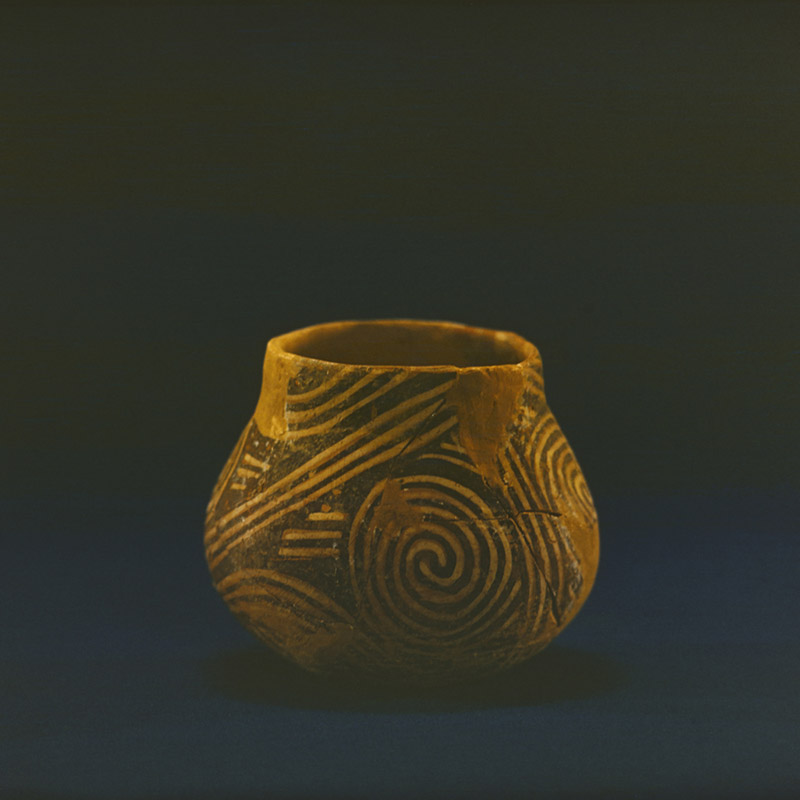

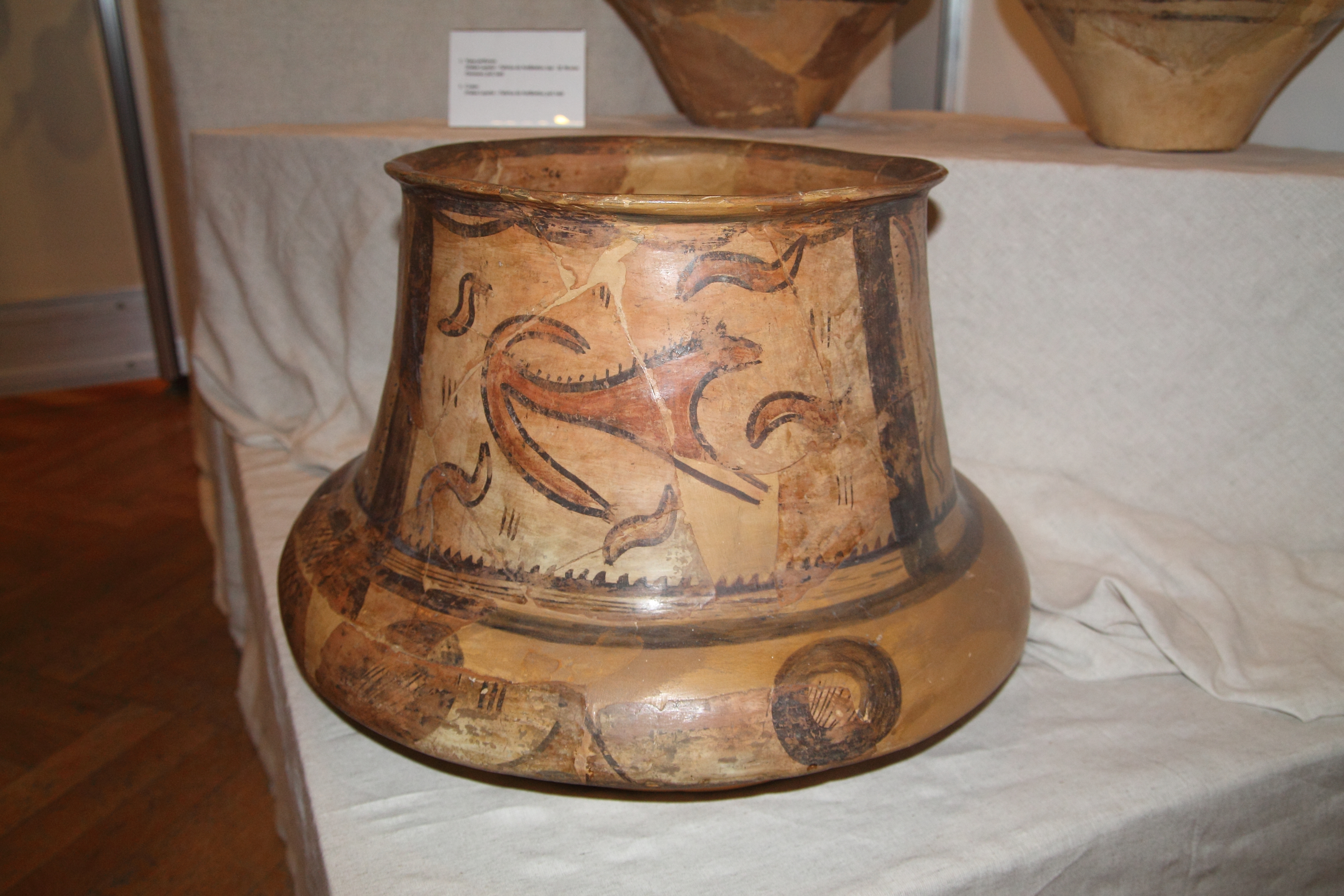

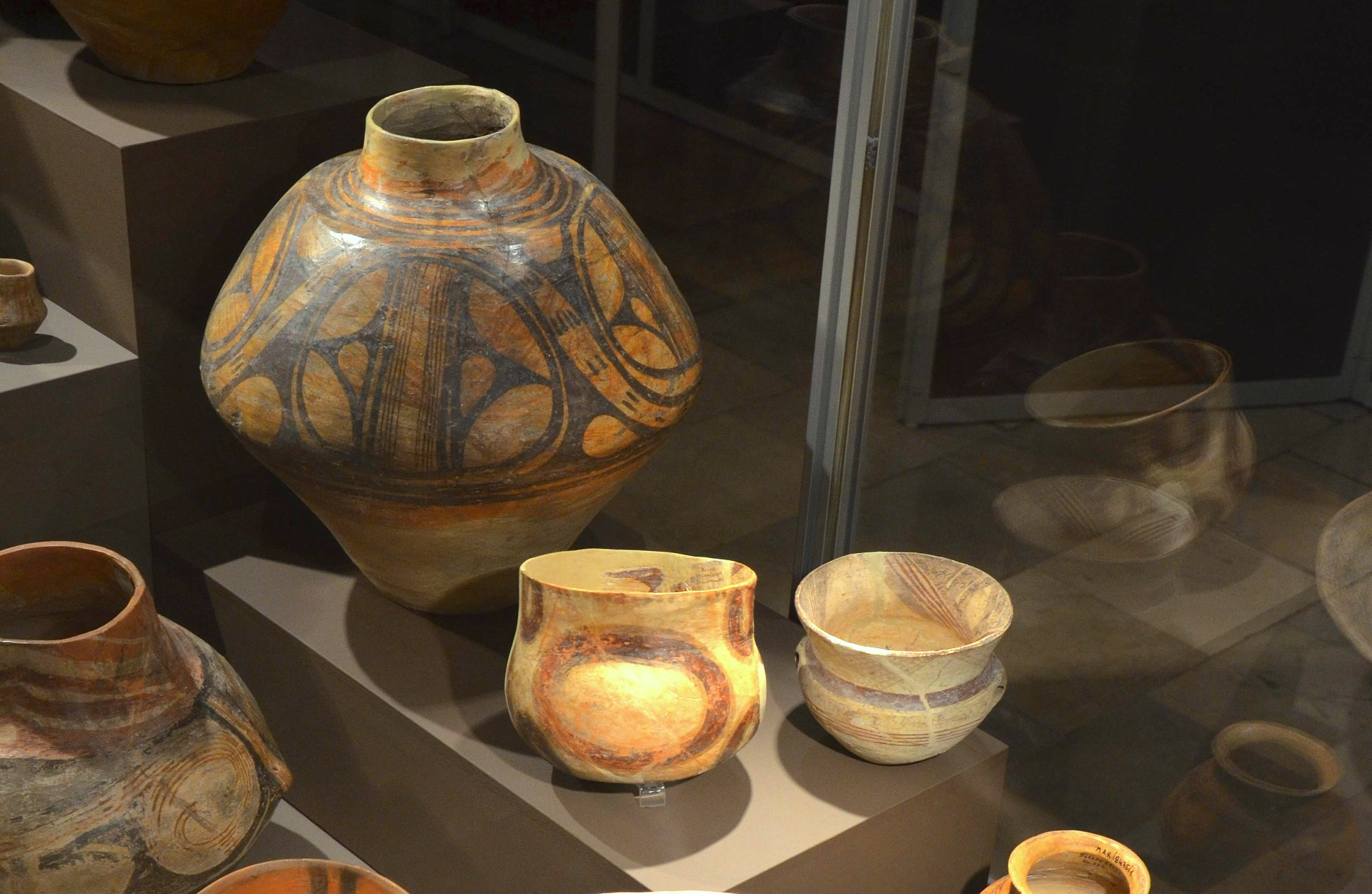

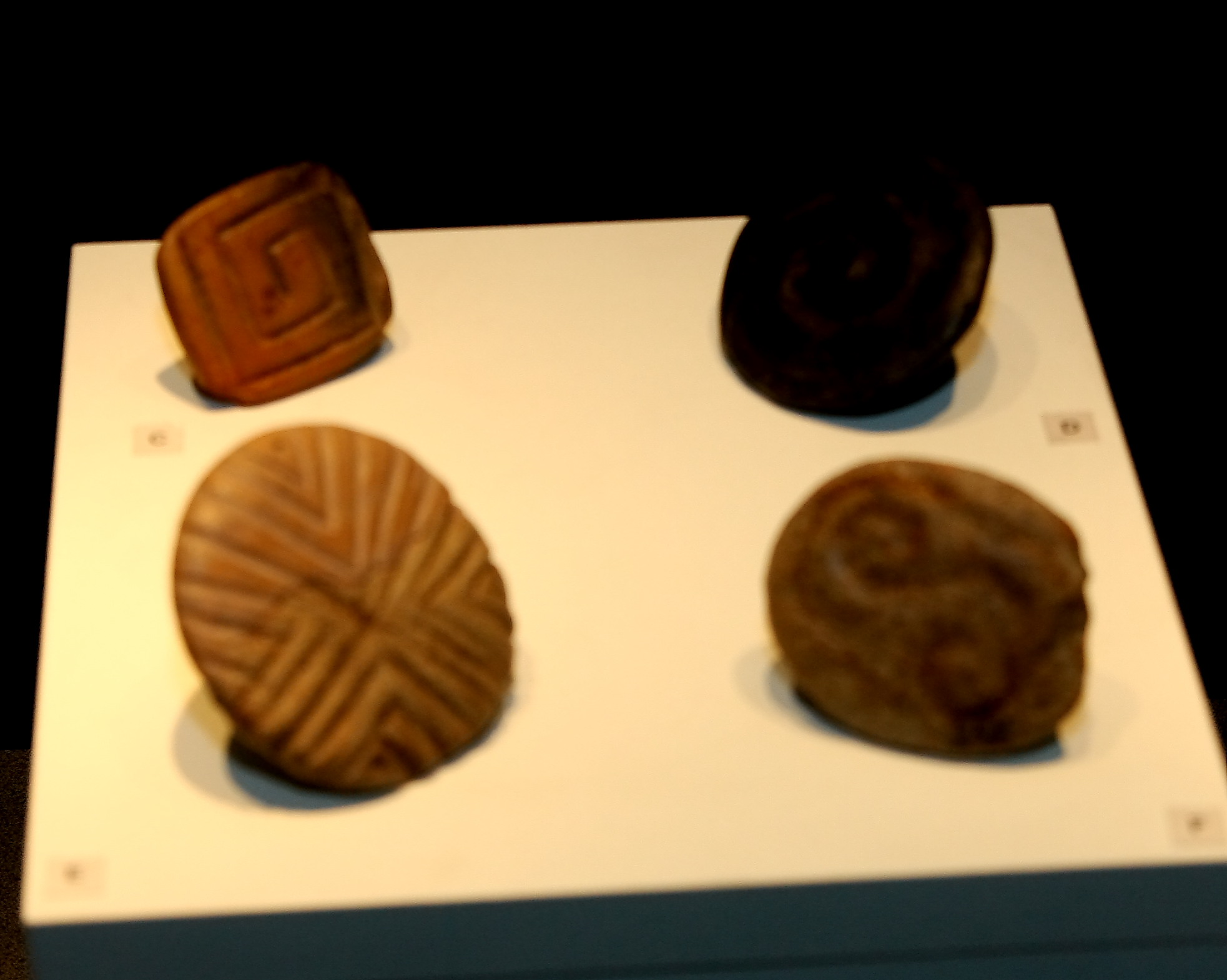

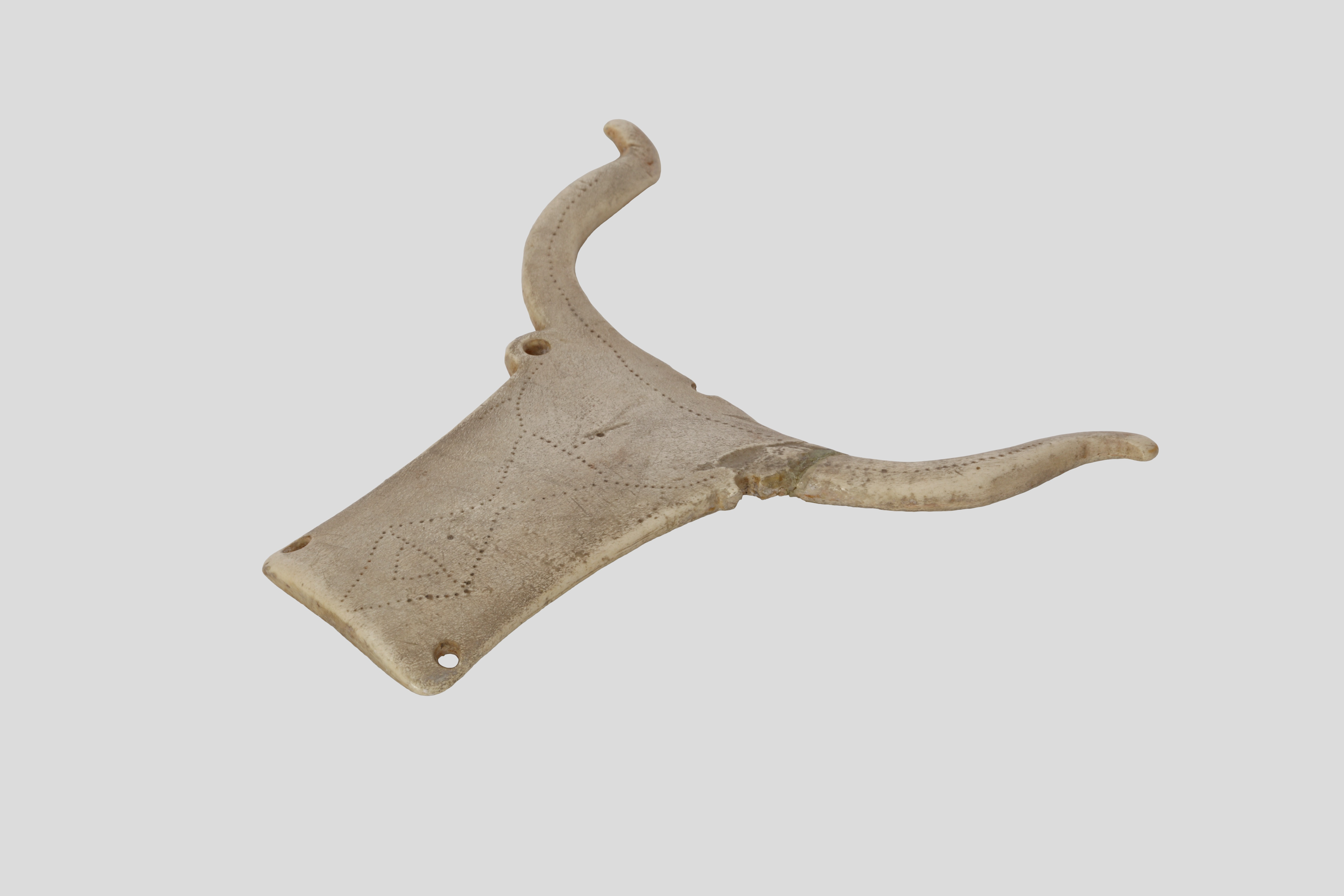

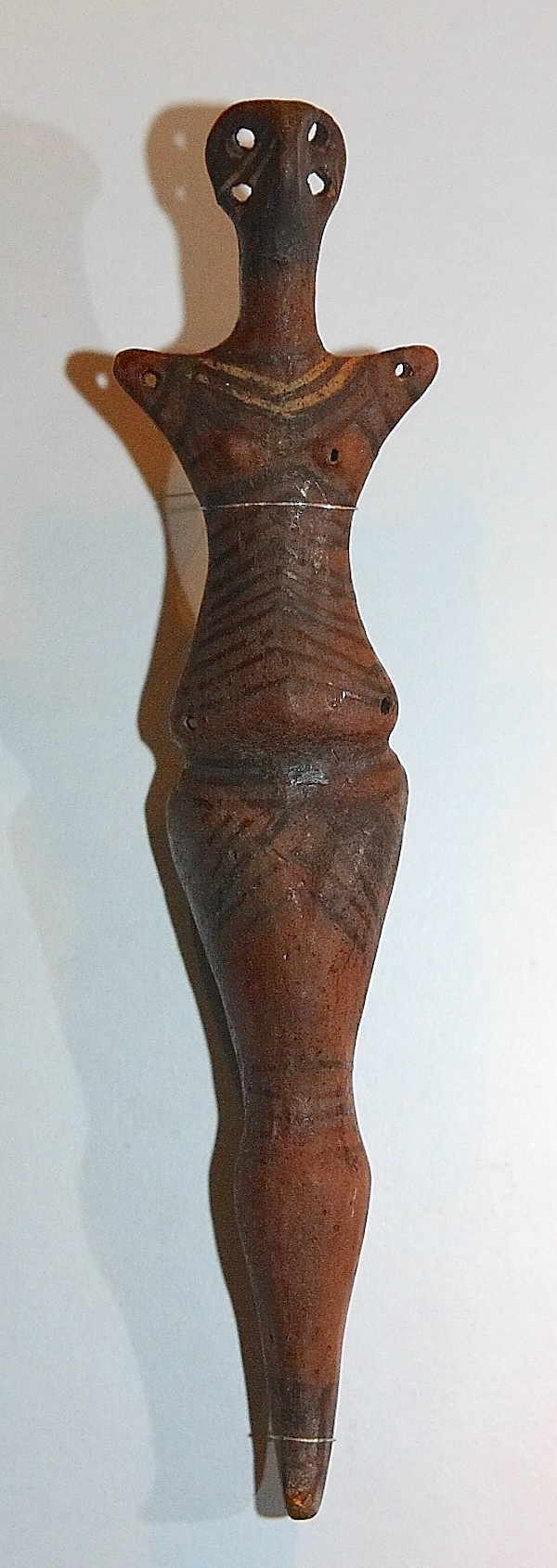

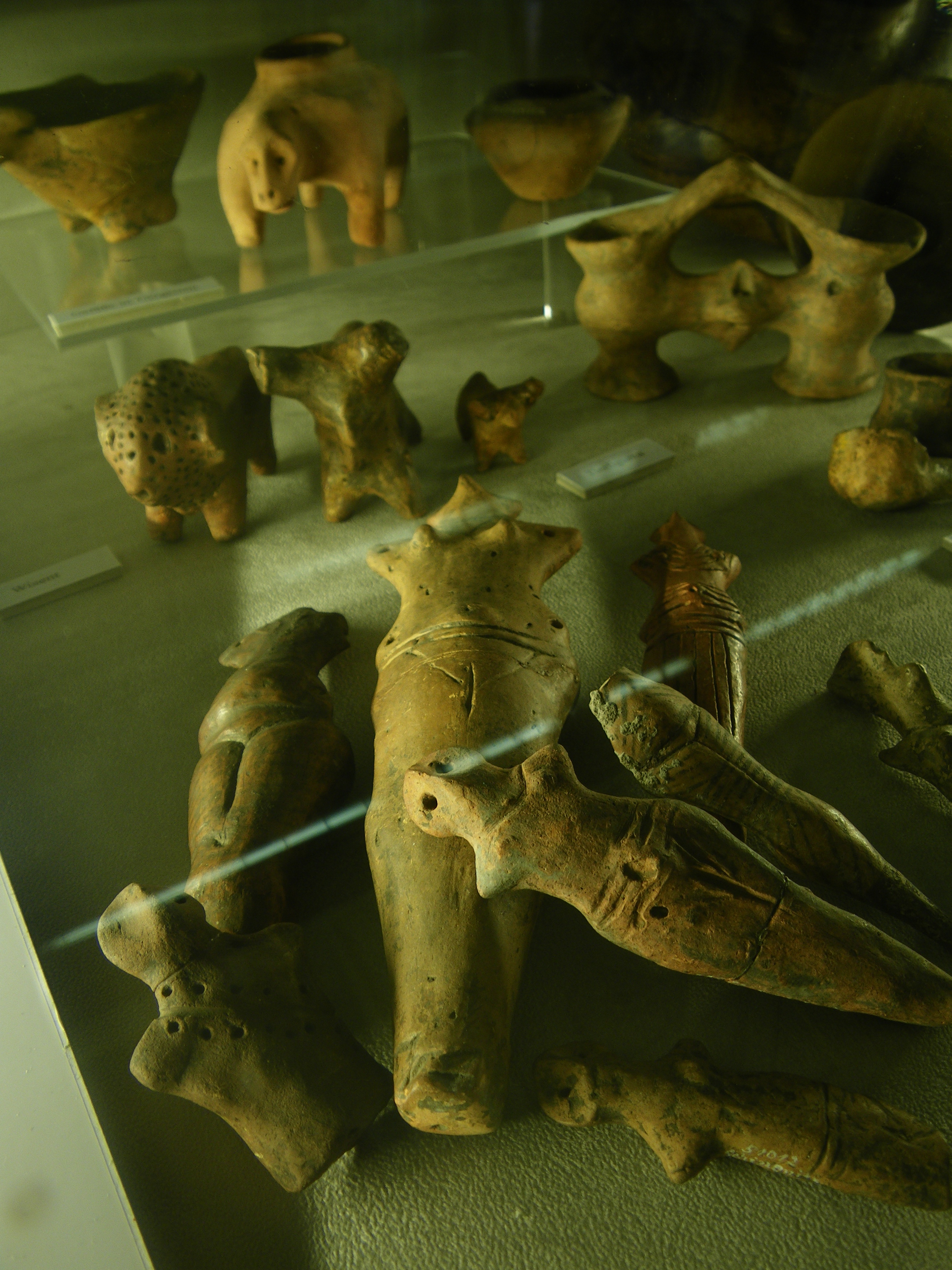

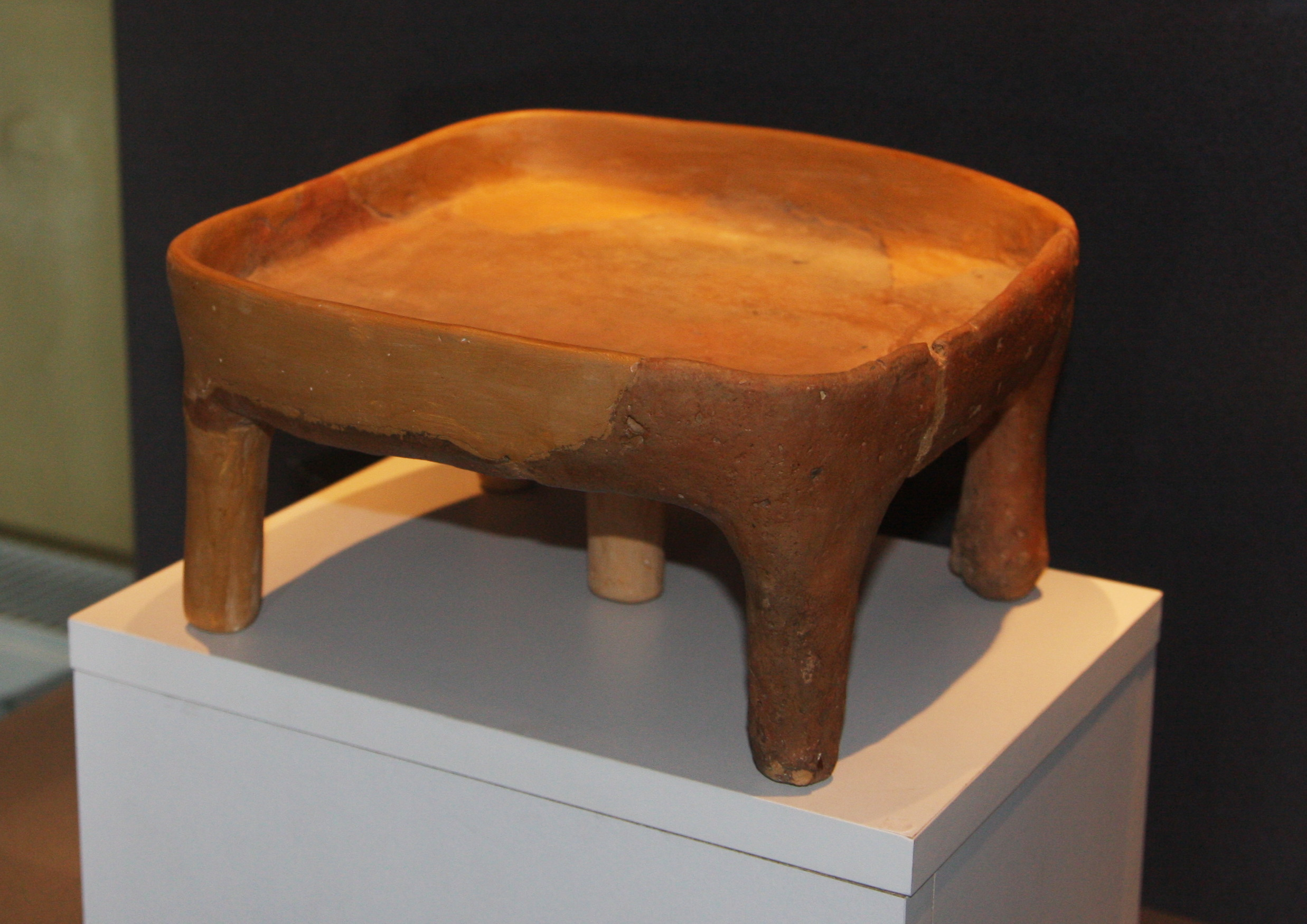

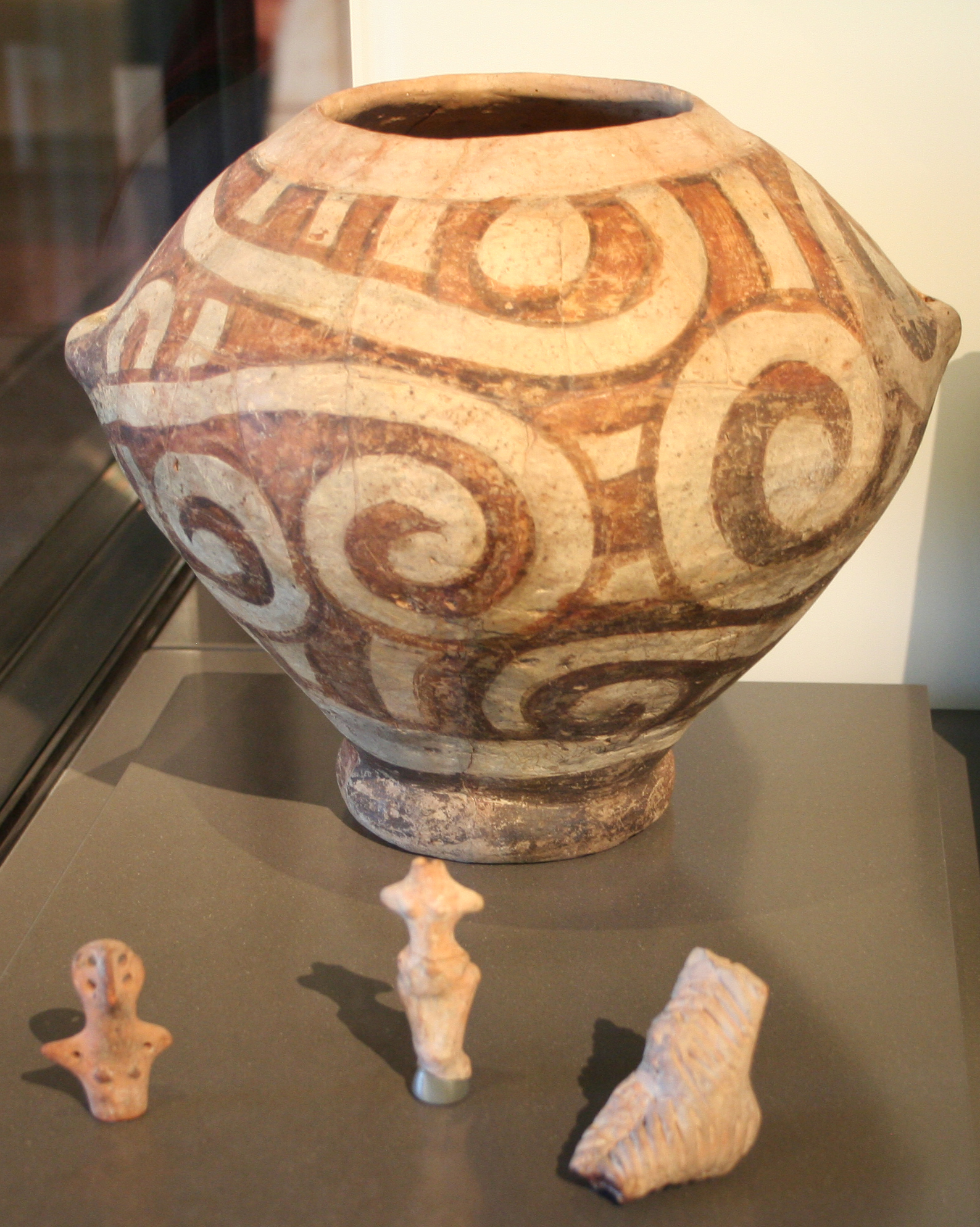

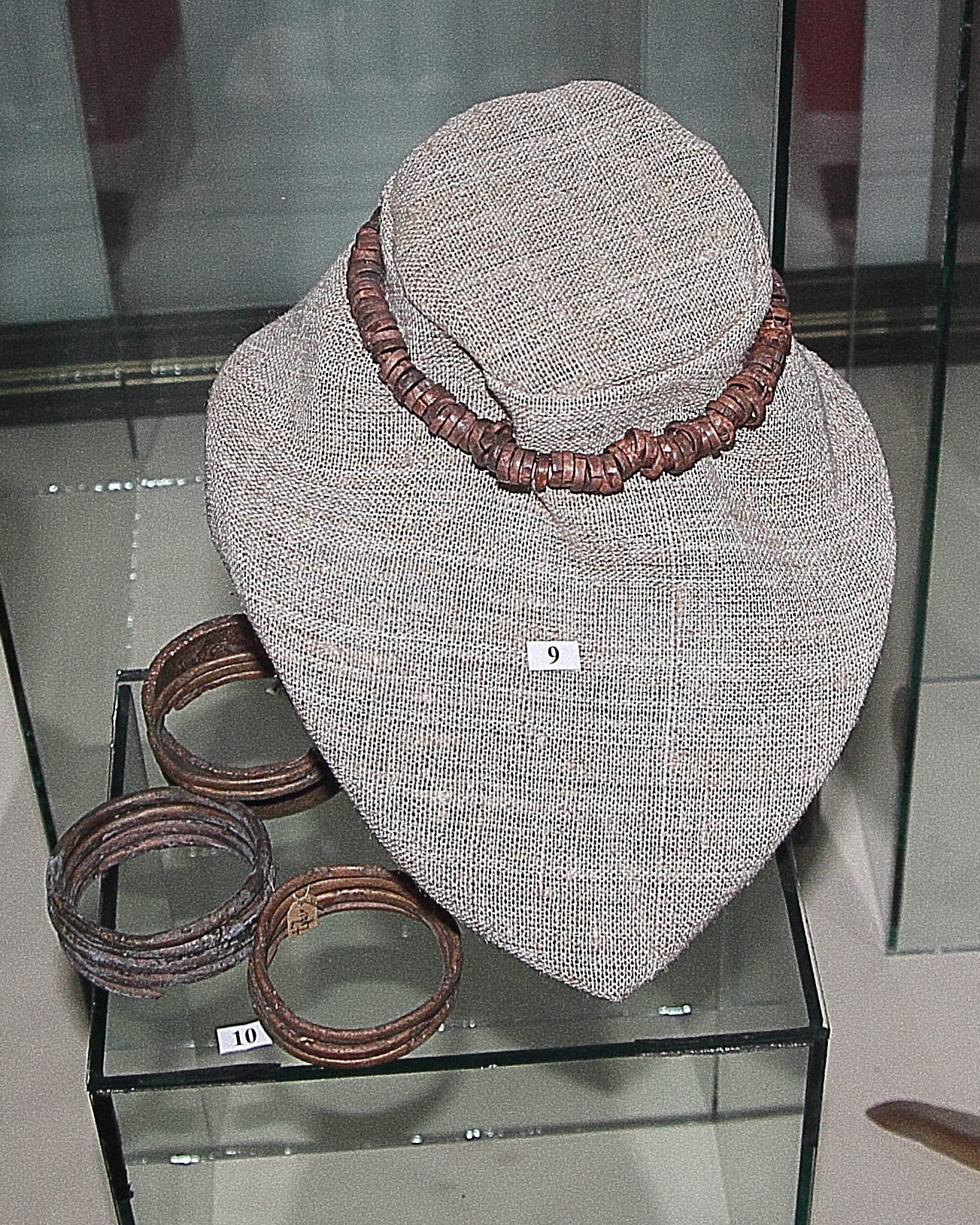
Copper jewellery

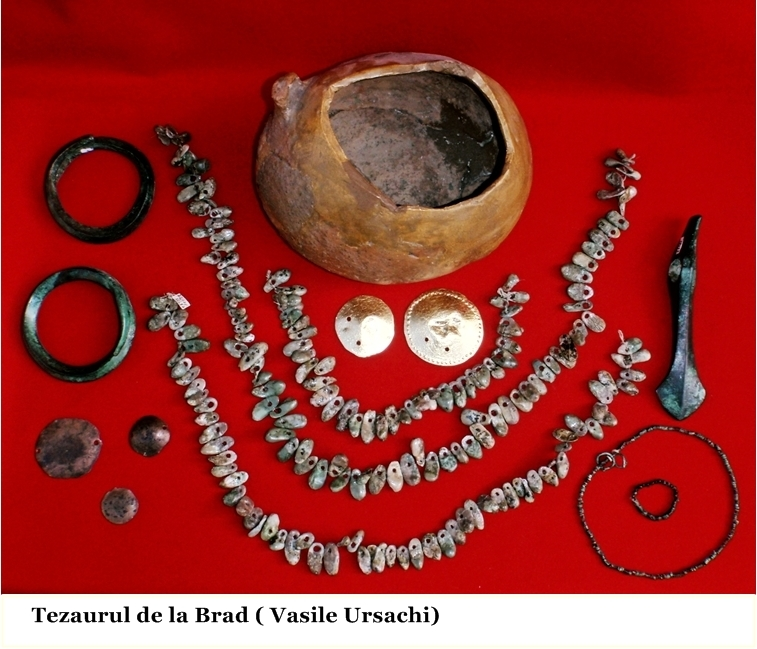
Copper and gold hoard

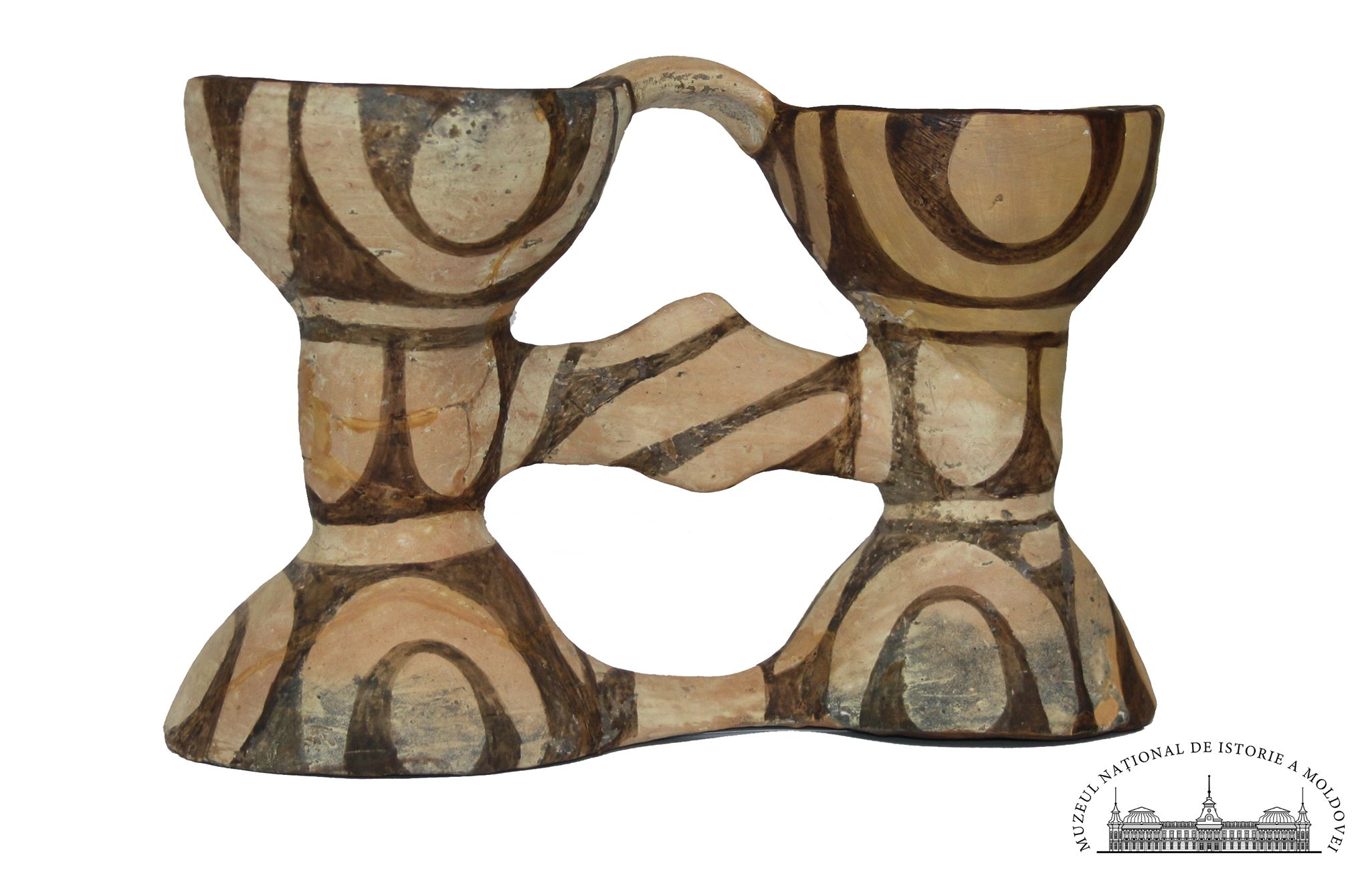

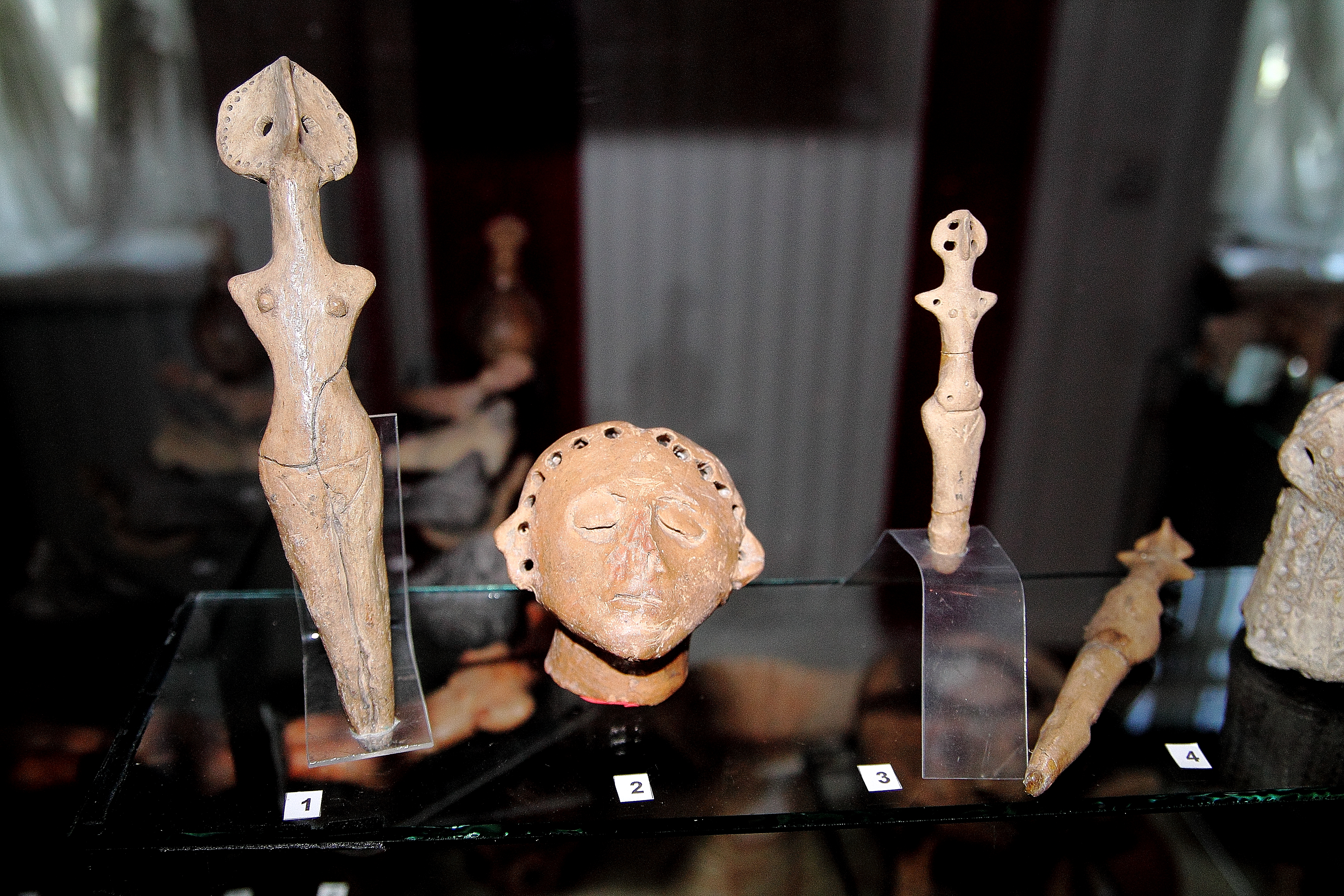

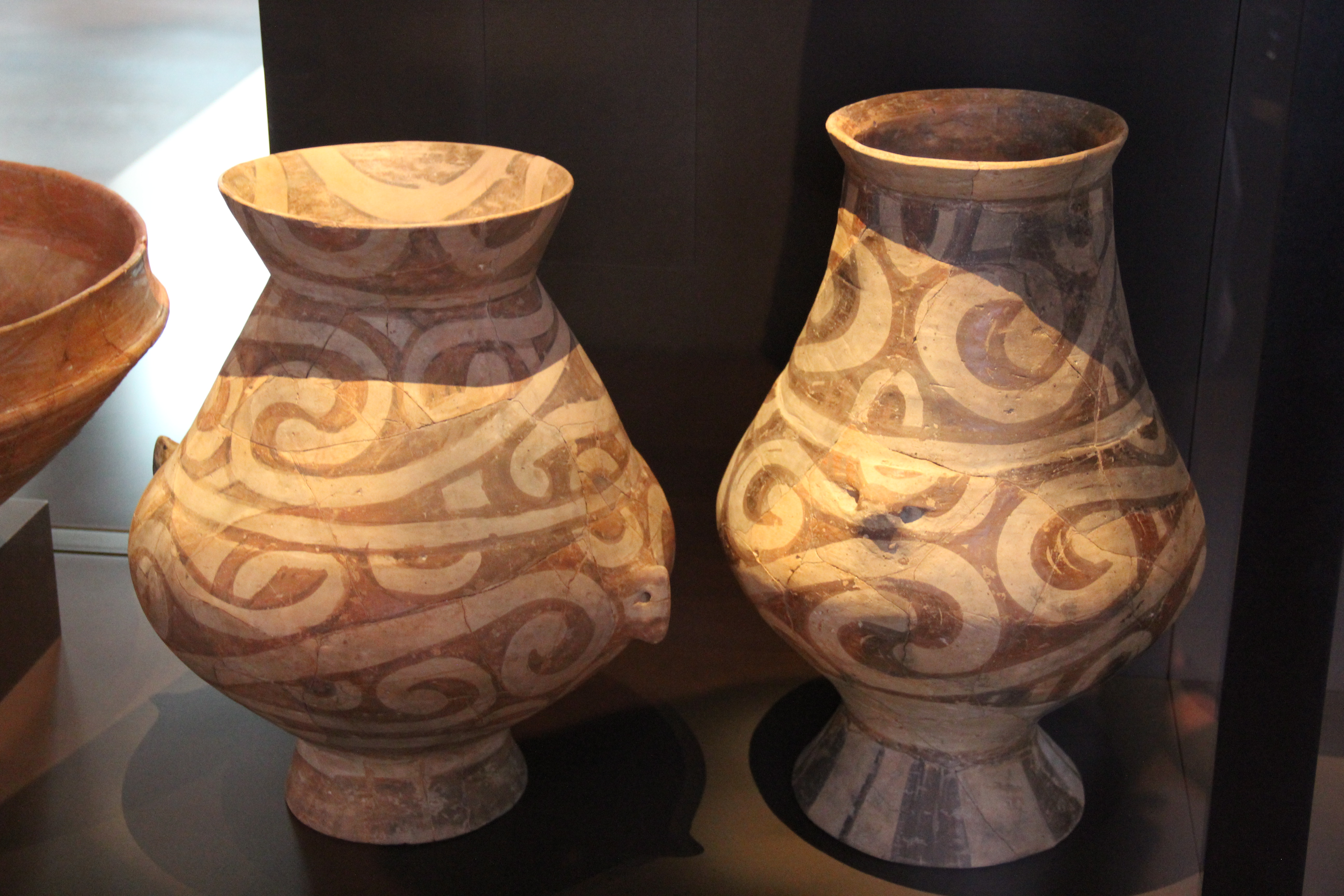

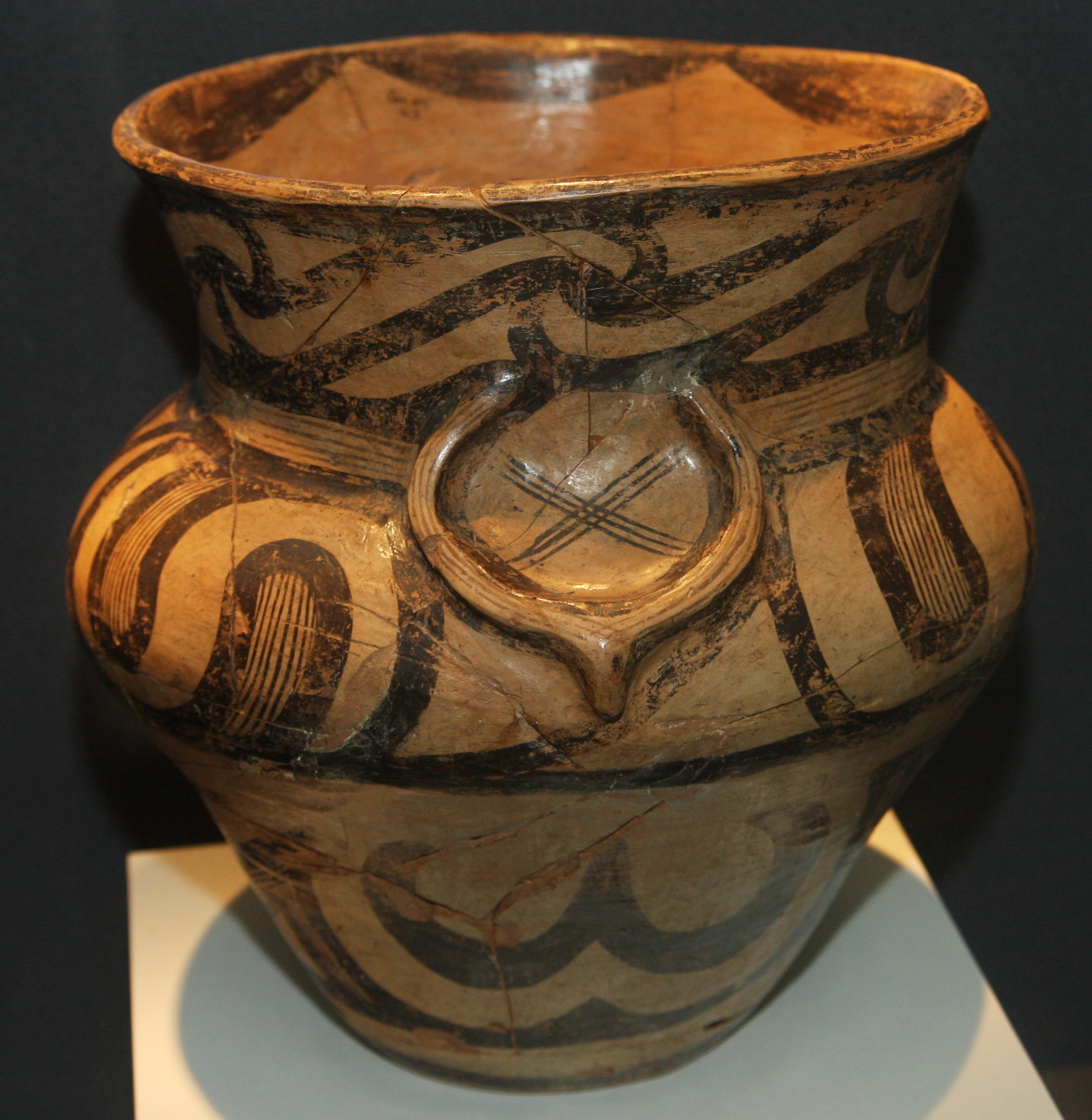

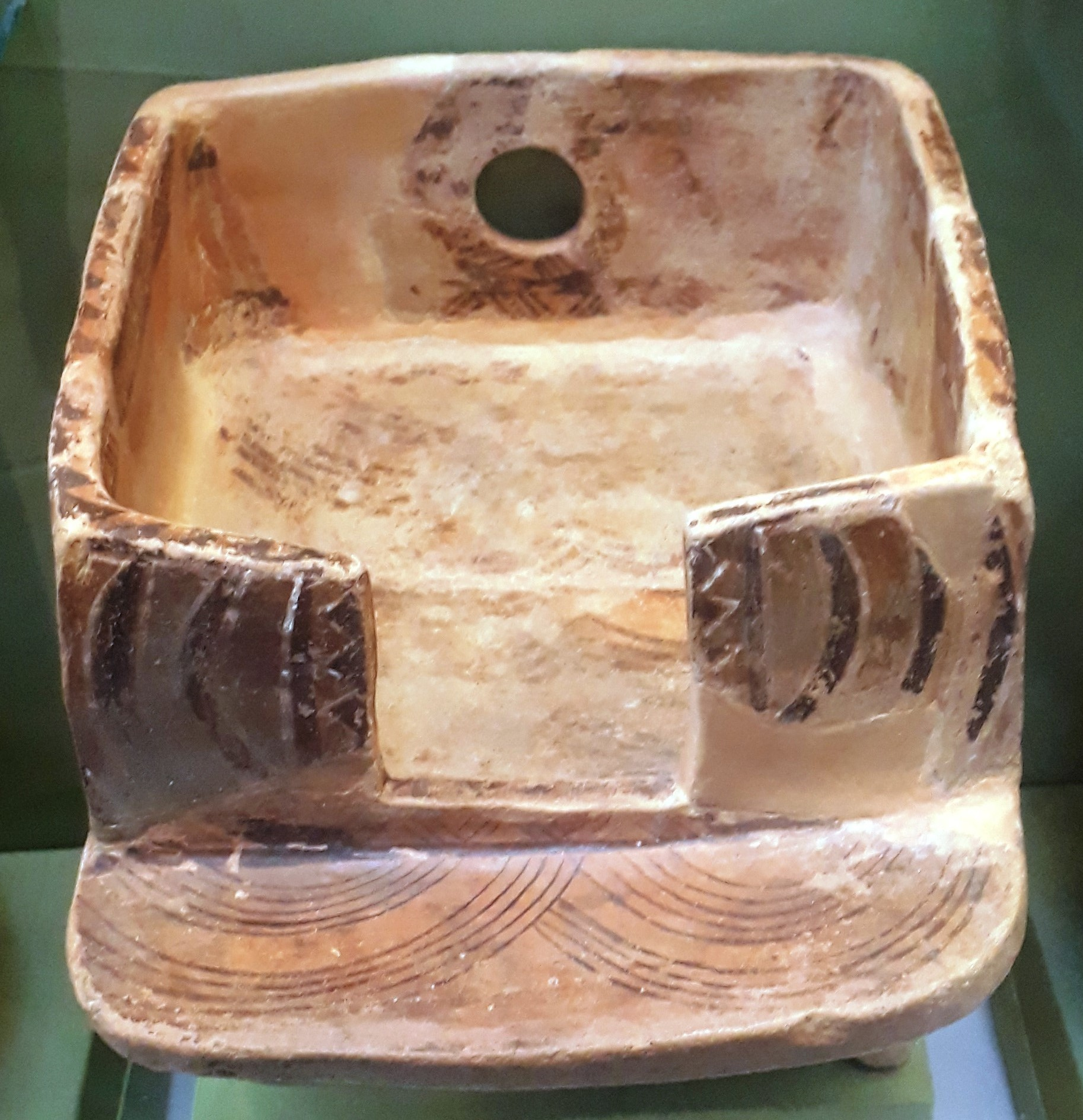

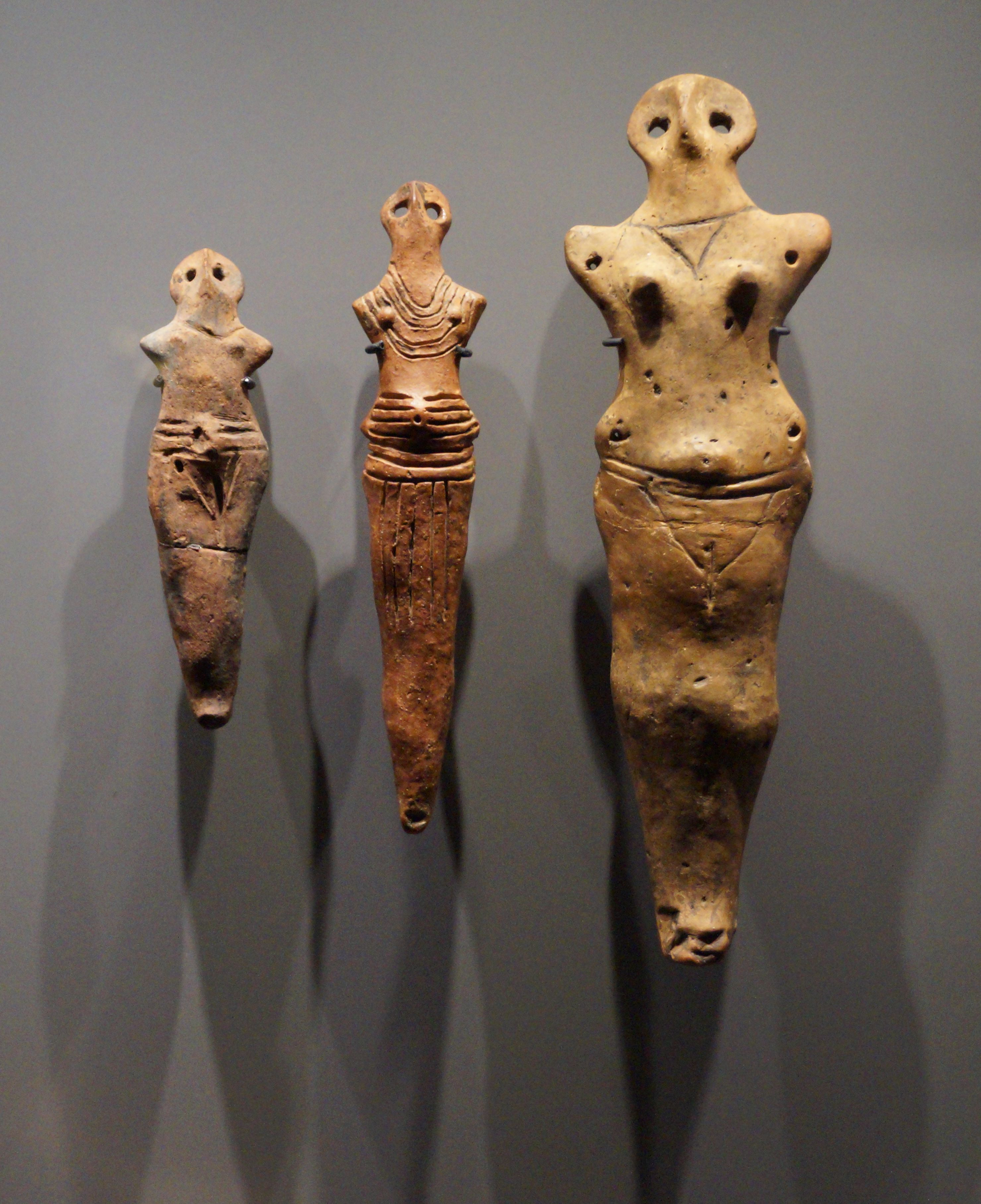

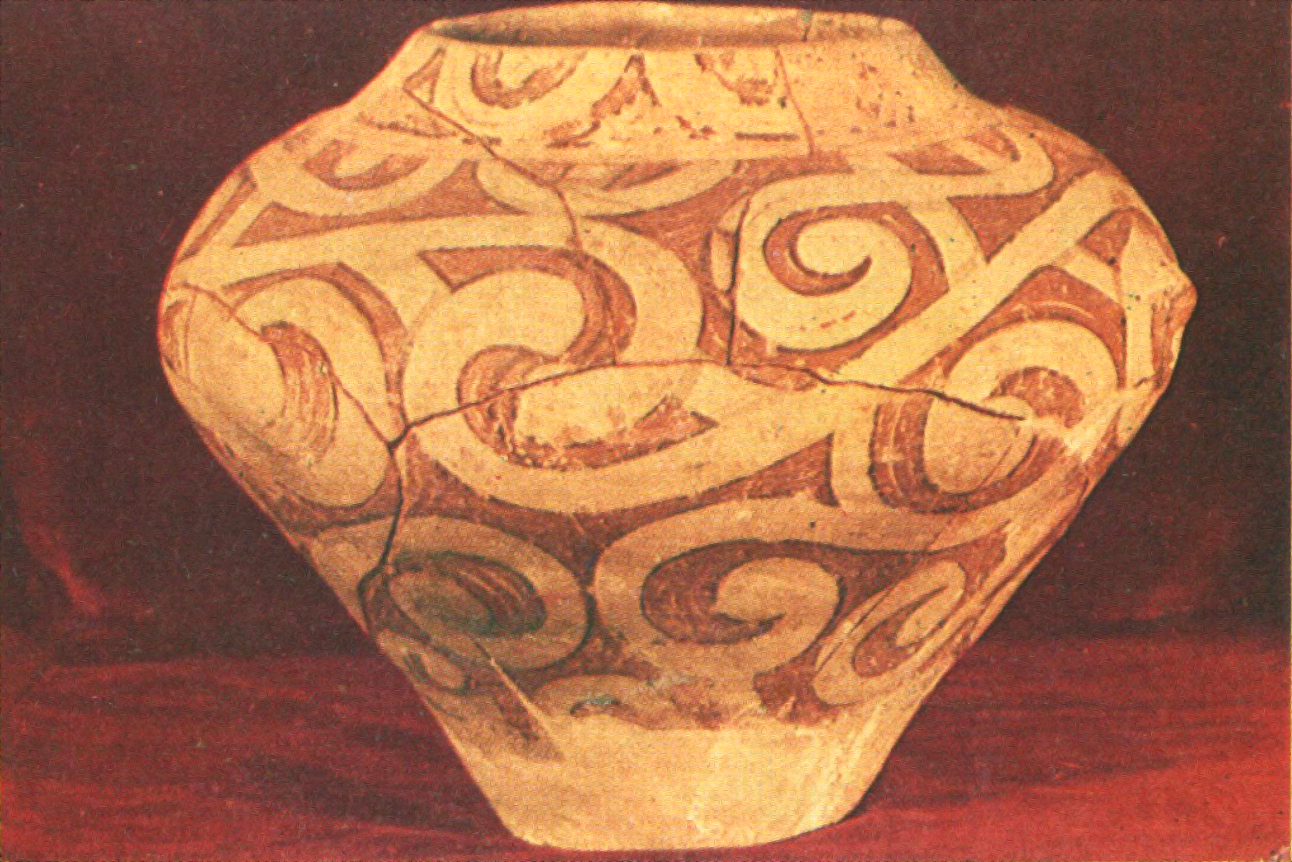

=== Diet ===
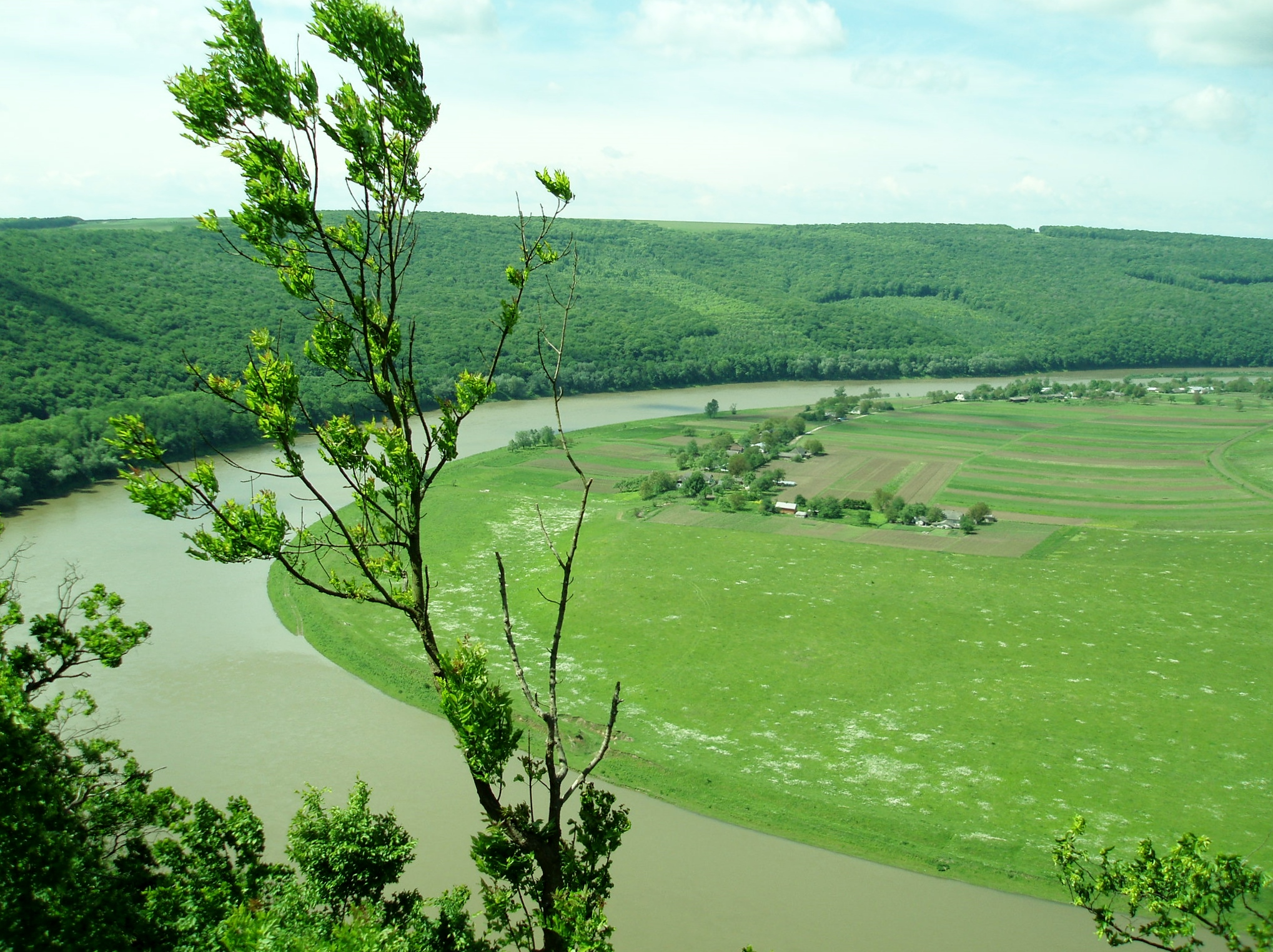
A Dniester river landscape in Ternopil Oblast, Western Ukraine

The Cucuteni–Trypillia culture was a society of subsistence farmers. Cultivating the soil with an ard or scratch plough, harvesting crops and tending livestock was probably the main occupation for most people. Typically for a Neolithic culture, the majority of their diet consisted of cereal grains. They cultivated club wheat, oats, rye, proso millet, barley and hemp, which were probably ground and baked as unleavened bread in clay ovens or on heated stones in the home. They grew peas and beans, apricot, cherry plum and wine grapes – though there is no solid evidence that they actually made wine. There is evidence that they may have kept bees.

The inhabitants of the large settlements had an almost entirely vegetarian diet, with meat making up only 10% of their diet. The inhabitants did not suffer from lack of proteins, as besides cereals, pulses were grown.

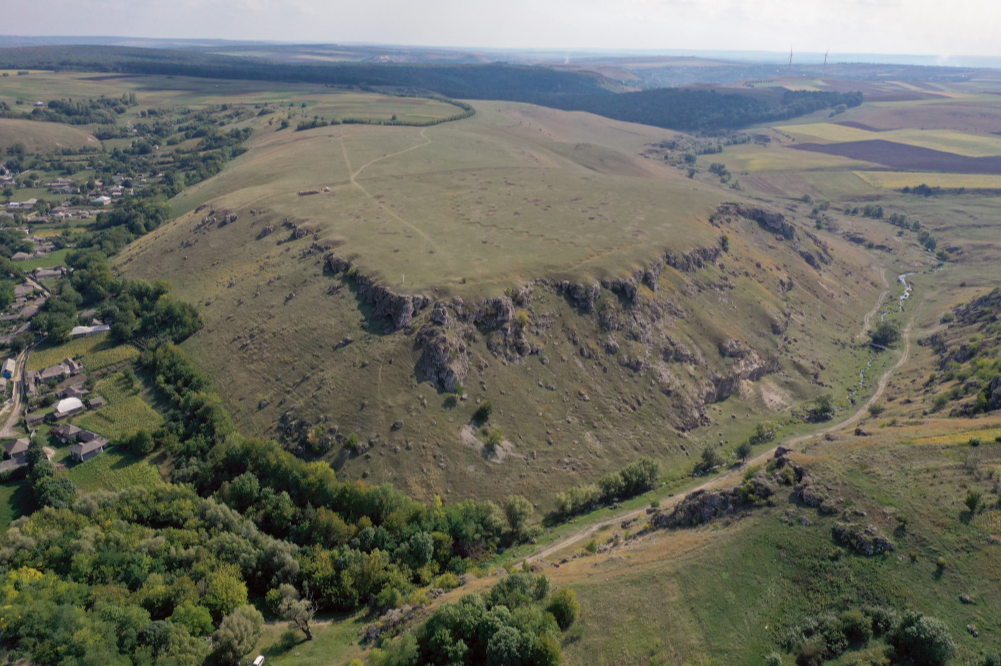
The site of a hill-top Trypillia settlement at Trinca-La Șanț, Moldova

The zooarchaeology of Cucuteni–Trypillia sites indicate that the inhabitants practiced animal husbandry. Their domesticated livestock consisted primarily of cattle, but included smaller numbers of pigs, sheep and goats. There is evidence, based on some of the surviving artistic depictions of animals from Cucuteni–Trypillia sites, that the ox was employed as a draft animal.

Both remains and artistic depictions of horses have been discovered at Cucuteni–Trypillia sites. Whether these finds are of domesticated or wild horses is debated. Before they were domesticated, humans hunted wild horses for meat. One hypothesis of horse domestication places it in the steppe region adjacent to the Cucuteni–Trypillia culture at roughly the same time (4000–3500 BC), so it is possible the culture was familiar with the domestic horse. At this time horses could have been kept both for meat or as a work animal. The direct evidence remains inconclusive.

Hunting supplemented the Cucuteni–Trypillia diet. They used traps to catch their prey, as well as weapons, including the bow and arrow, the spear and clubs. To help them in stalking game, they sometimes disguised themselves with camouflage. Remains of game species found at Cucuteni–Trypillia sites include red deer, roe deer, aurochs, wild boar, fox and brown bear.

=== Salt ===
The earliest known salt works in the world is at the Poiana Slatinei site, near the village of Lunca, Romania. It was first used in the early Neolithic, around 6050 BC, by the Starčevo culture, and later by the Cucuteni–Trypillia culture in the Pre-Cucuteni period. Evidence from this and other sites indicates that the Cucuteni–Trypillia culture extracted salt from salt-laden spring-water through the process of briquetage. First, the brackish water from the spring was boiled in large pottery vessels, producing a dense brine. The brine was then heated in a ceramic briquetage vessel until all moisture was evaporated, with the remaining crystallised salt adhering to the inside walls of the vessel. Then the briquetage vessel was broken open, and the salt was scraped from the shards.

The provision of salt was a major logistical problem for the largest Cucuteni–Trypillia settlements. As they came to rely upon cereal foods over salty meat and fish, Neolithic cultures had to incorporate supplementary sources of salt into their diet. Similarly, domestic cattle need to be provided with extra sources of salt beyond their normal diet or their milk production is reduced. Cucuteni–Trypillia mega-sites, with a population of likely thousands of people and animals, are estimated to have required between 36,000 and 100,000 kg of salt per year. This was not available locally, and so had to be moved in bulk from distant sources on the western Black Sea coast and in the Carpathian Mountains, probably by river.

== Technology and material culture ==
The Cucuteni–Trypillia culture is known by its distinctive settlements, architecture, intricately decorated pottery and anthropomorphic and zoomorphic figurines, which are preserved in archaeological remains. At its peak it was one of the most technologically advanced societies in the world at the time, developing new techniques for ceramic production, housing building, agriculture and producing woven textiles (although these have not survived and are known indirectly).

=== Settlements ===
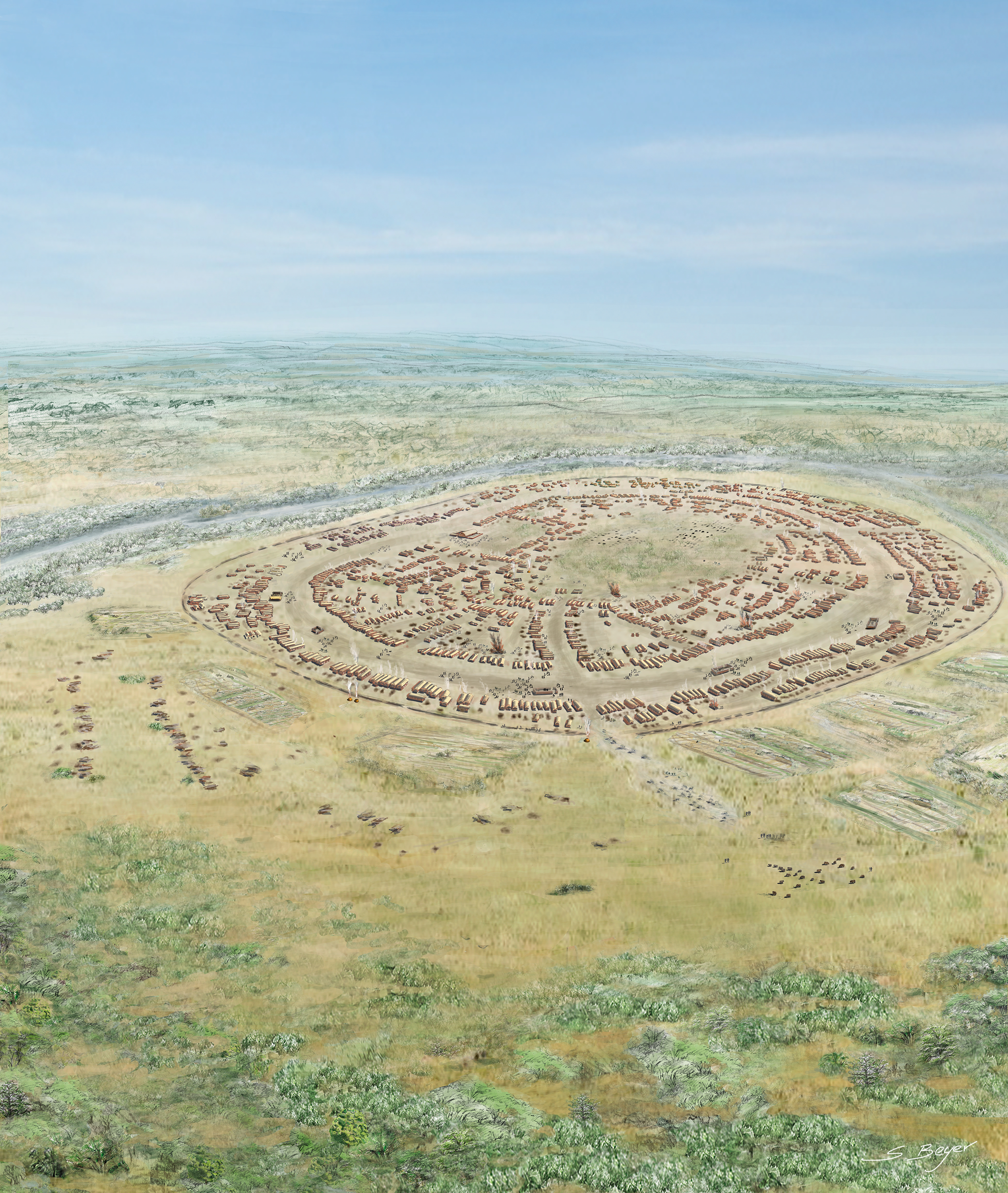
A reconstruction of the main occupation phase of the Maidanetske mega-site, c. 3800 BC.

In terms of overall size, some of Cucuteni–Trypillia sites, such as Talianki (with a population of 15,000 and covering an area of 335 hectares) in the province of Uman Raion, Ukraine, are as large as (or perhaps even larger than) the city-states of Sumer in the Fertile Crescent, and these Eastern European settlements predate the Sumerian cities by more than half of a millennium.

Some scholars suggested that Trypillia mega-settlements served as temporary housing for refugees from other Trypillia and related communities of the North Pontic area. A. Diachenko considers these to be climate refugees from Trypillia-settled areas in the northwest, while A. G. Nikitin suggests these were migrants from the Gumelnița-Karanovo VI sites in the west Pontic.

Archaeologists have uncovered a large number of artefacts from these ancient ruins. The largest collections of Cucuteni–Trypillia artefacts are to be found in museums in Russia, Ukraine and Romania, including the Hermitage Museum in St. Petersburg and the Archaeology Museum Piatra Neamț in Romania. Smaller collections of artefacts are kept in many local museums scattered throughout the region.

These settlements underwent periodical acts of destruction and re-creation, as they were burned and then rebuilt every 60–80 years. Some scholars have theorised that the inhabitants of these settlements believed that every house symbolised an organic, almost living, entity. Each house, including its ceramic vases, ovens, figurines and innumerable objects made of perishable materials, shared the same circle of life, and all of the buildings in the settlement were physically linked together as a larger symbolic entity. As with living beings, the settlements may have been seen as also having a life cycle of death and rebirth.

In 2024, researchers from the Collaborative Research Centre 1266 at the Kiel University found that the mega-sites were associated with reduced social inequality. It was only after several generations that increased social differentiation re-emerged and this may explain the subsequent abandonment of the mega-sites. Thus, social complexity need not be associated with greater social stratification and that large aggregations of population can find mechanisms to reduce inequality.

The houses of the Cucuteni–Trypillia settlements were constructed in several general ways:

- Wattle-and-daub homes.
- Log homes, called (Ukrainian: площадки, romanized: ploshchadky).
- Semi-underground homes called bordei.

Some Cucuteni–Trypillia homes were two storeys tall, and evidence shows that the members of this culture sometimes decorated the outsides of their homes with many of the same red-ochre complex swirling designs that are to be found on their pottery. Most houses had thatched roofs and wooden floors covered with clay.

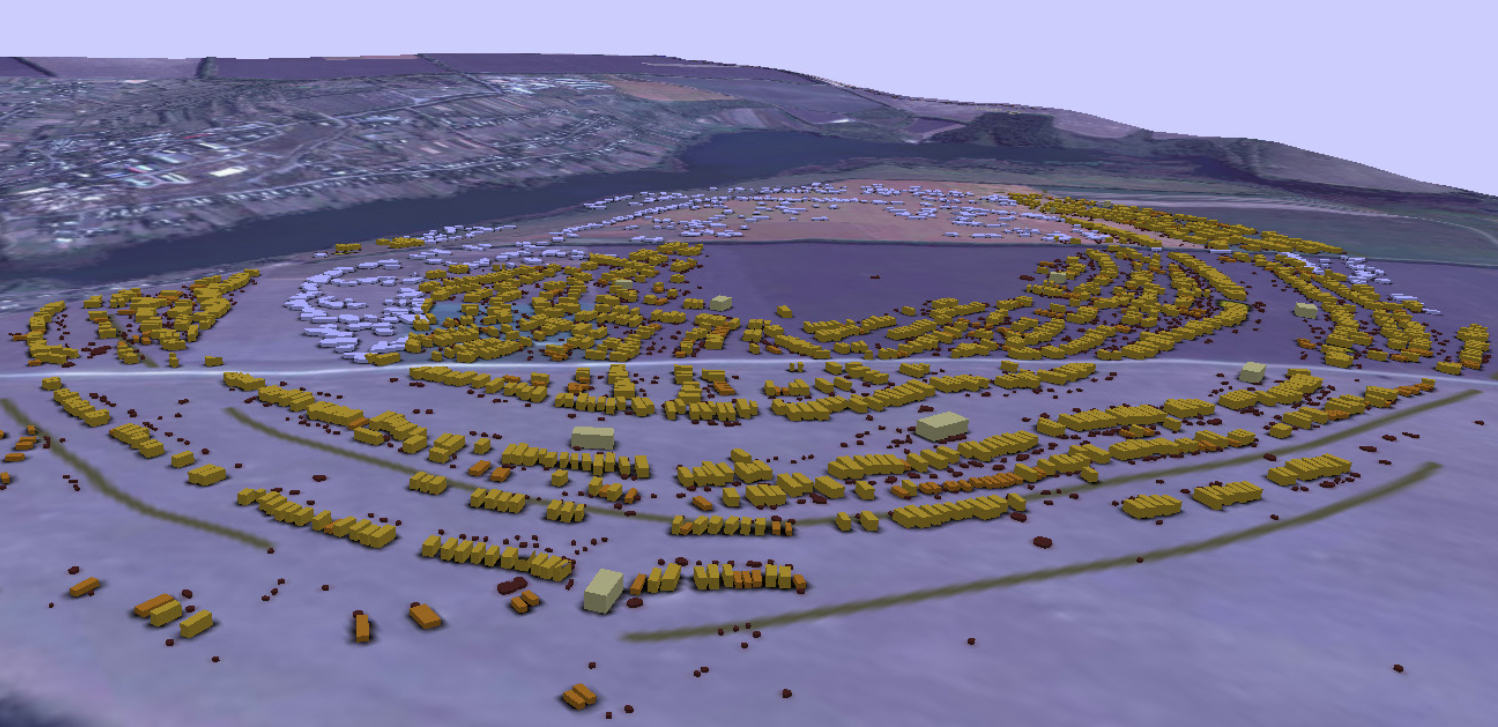
Maidanetske mega-site, c. 3700 BC, 3D model.

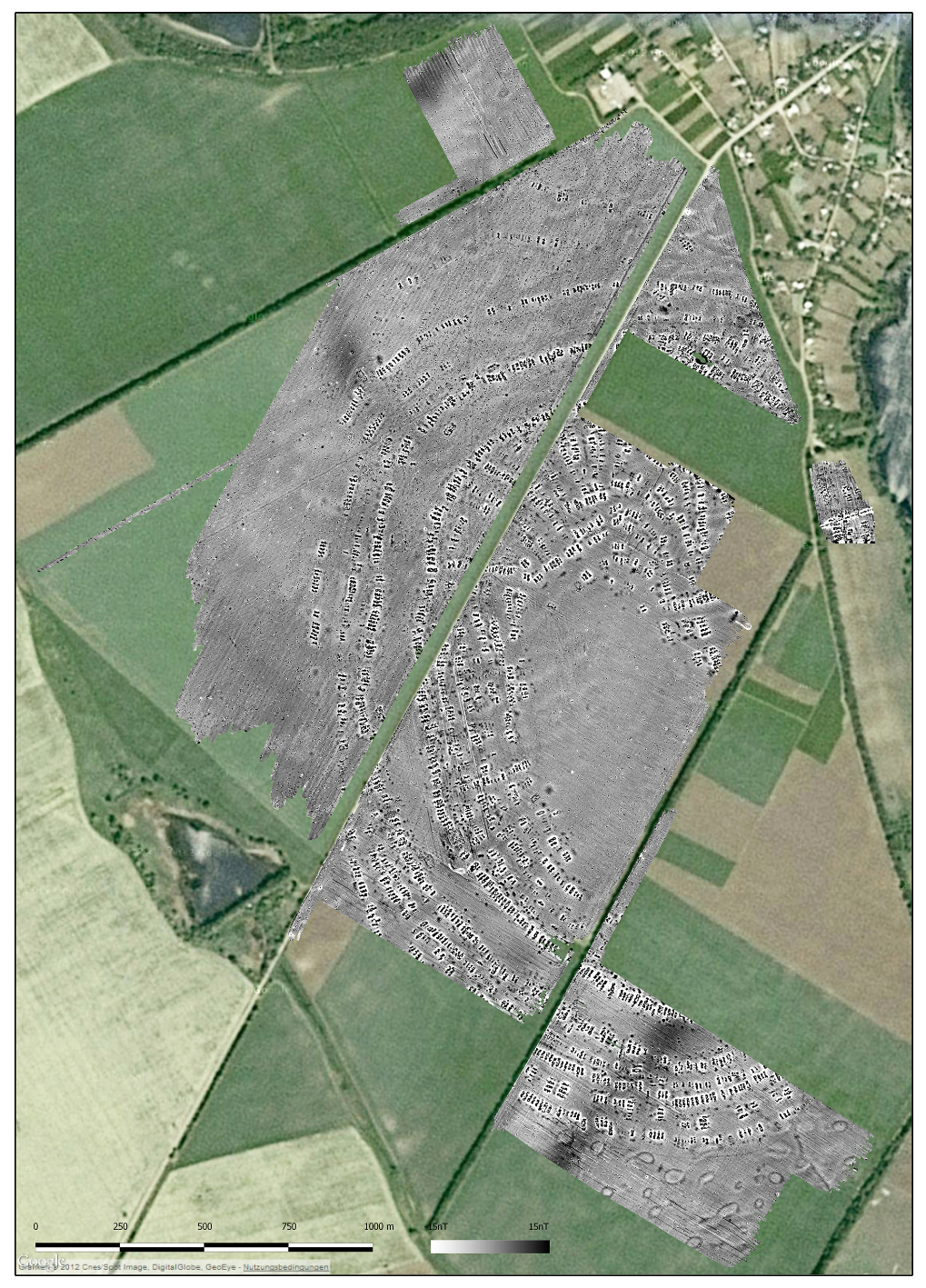
Maidanetske geomagnetic ground plan.

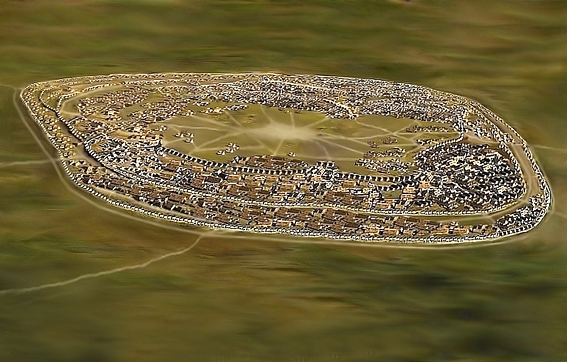
A reconstruction of the Talianki mega-site

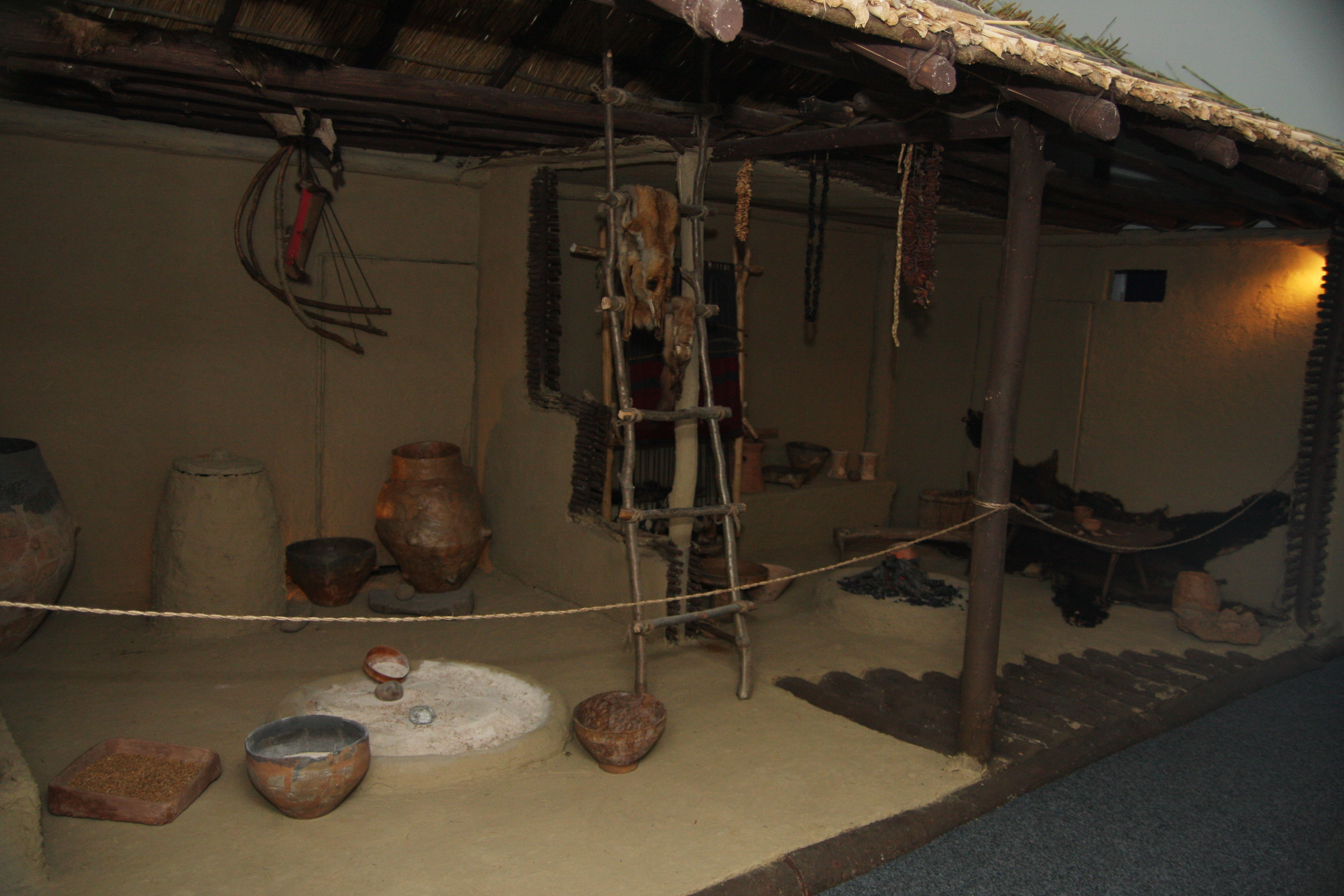
House interior reconstruction

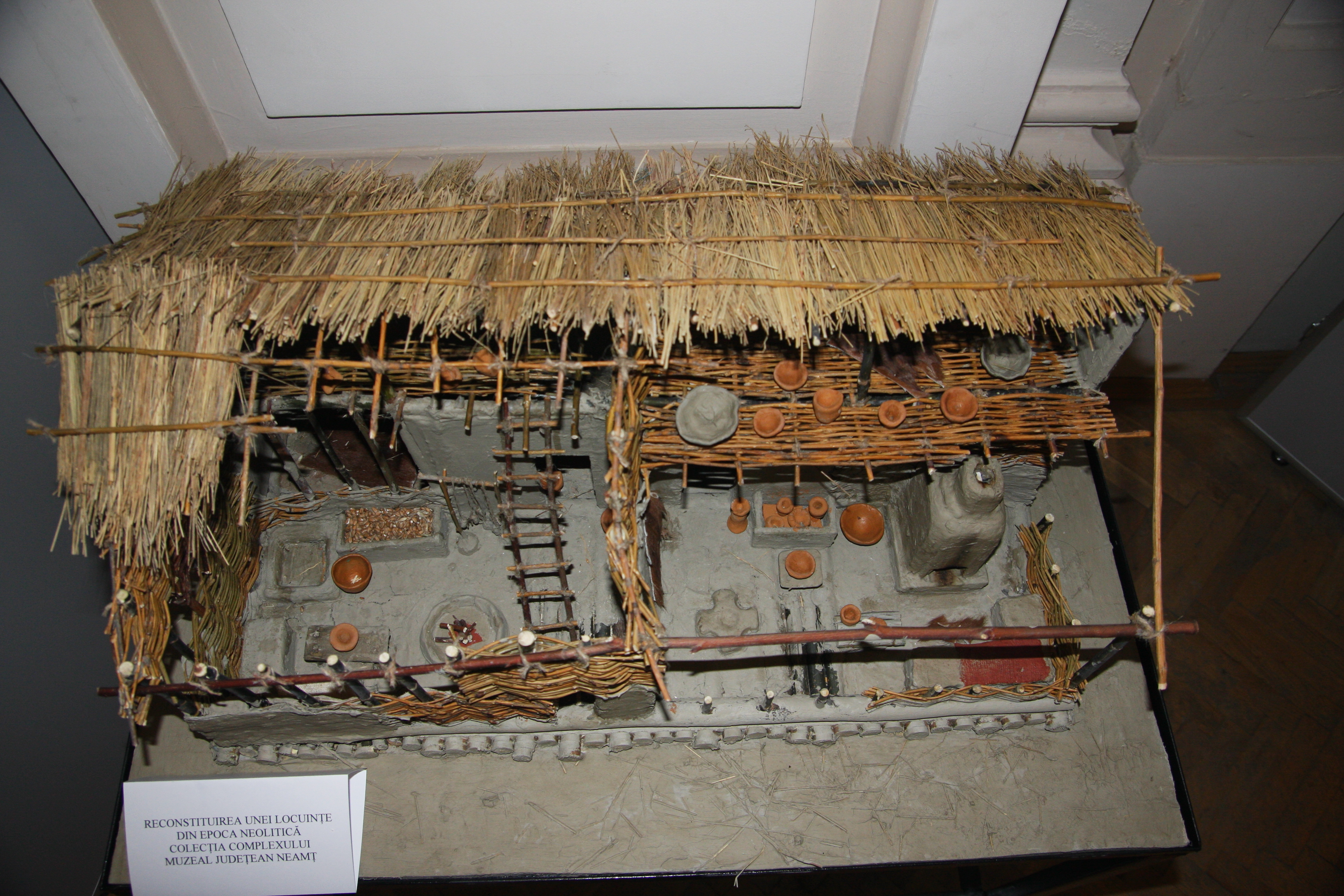
Top view of Cucuteni house model

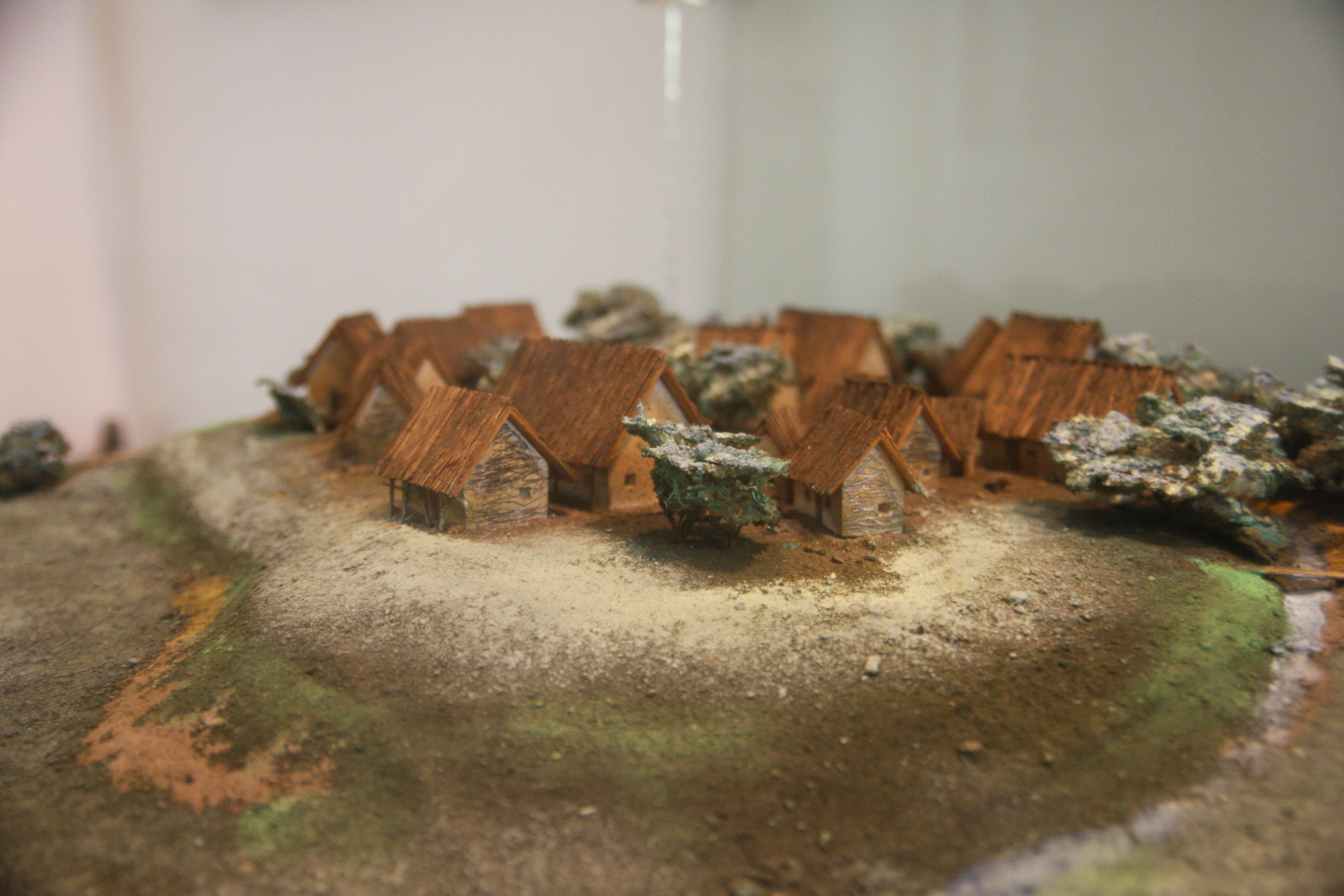
Village model

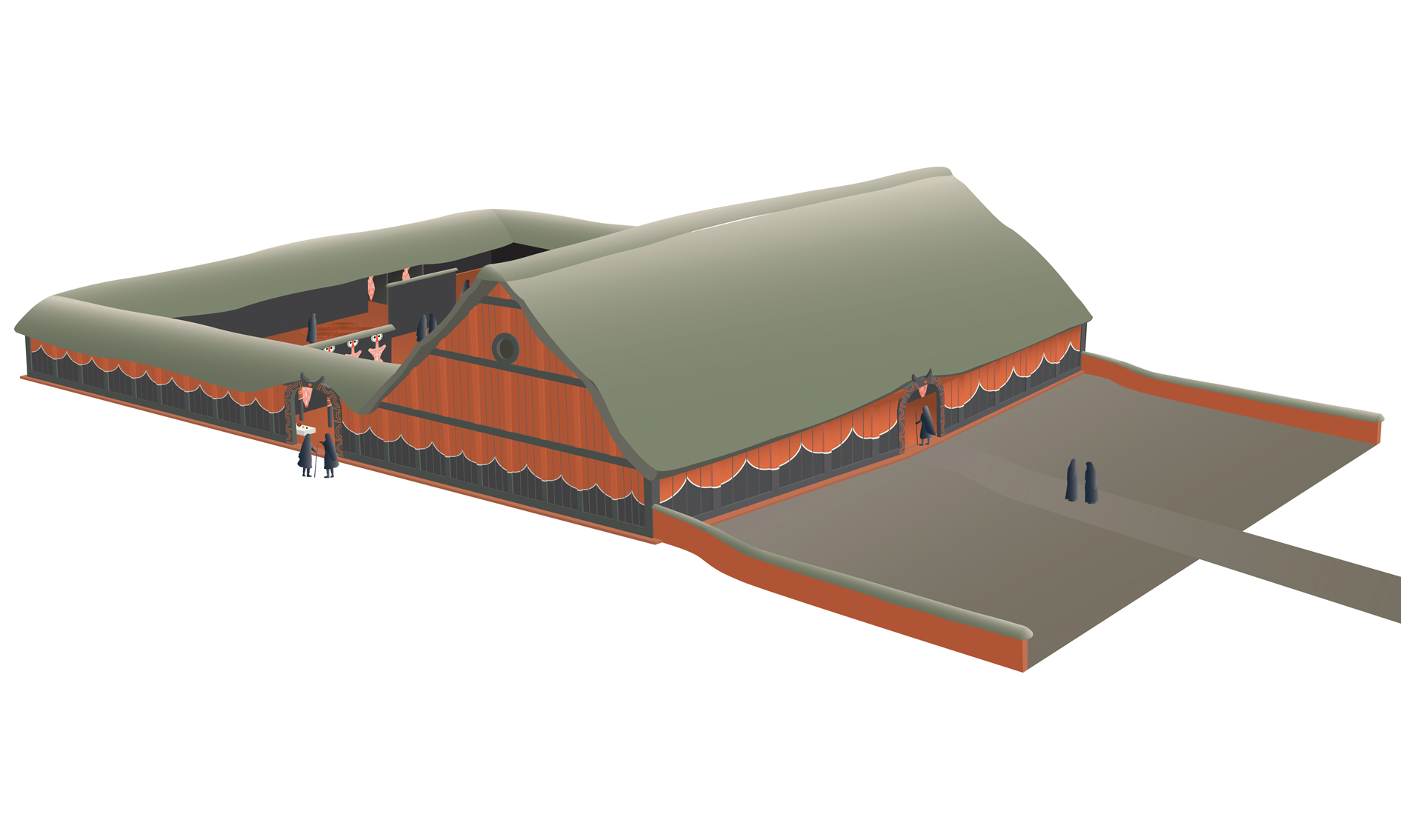
Nebelivka temple, reconstruction.

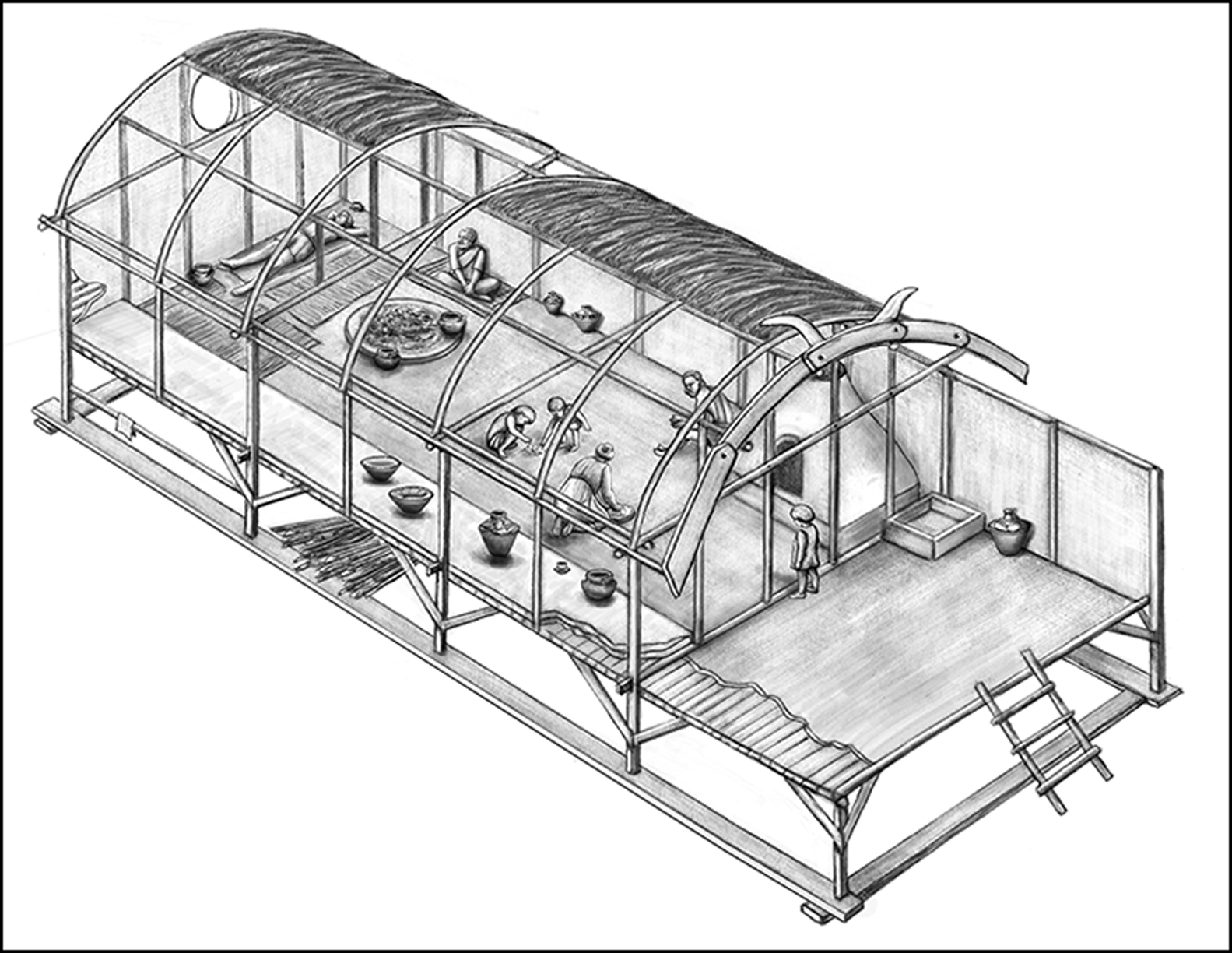
House with raised platform at Maidanetsk, c. 3700 BC, reconstruction

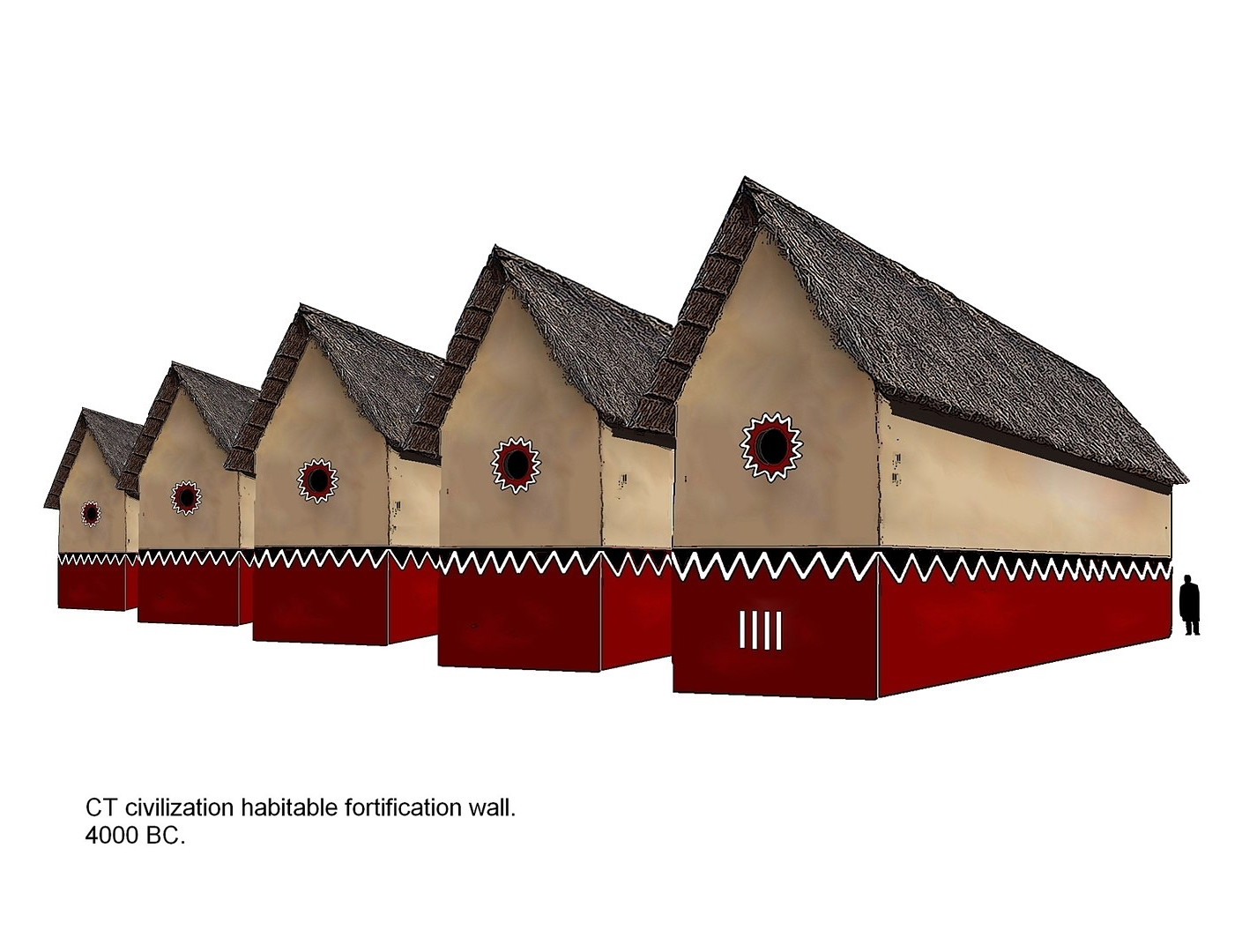
Illustration of interconnected houses from Maidanetsk

=== Pottery ===
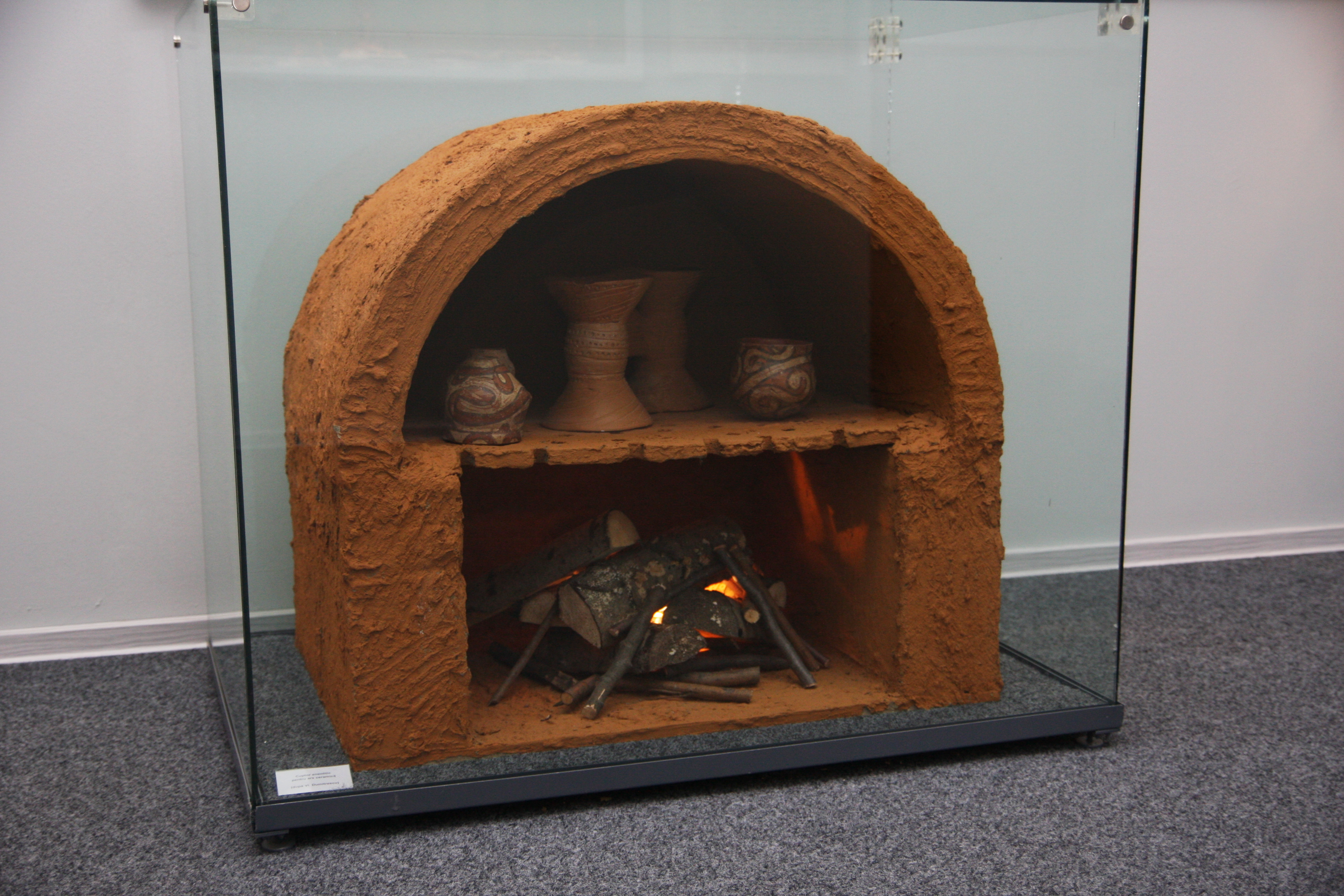
A model of a Cucuteni-Trypillia pottery kiln

Most Cucuteni–Trypillia pottery was hand coiled from local clay. Long coils of clay were placed in circles to form first the base and then the walls of the vessel. Once the desired shape and height of the finished product was built up the sides would then be smoothed to create a seamless surface. This technique was the earliest form of pottery shaping and the most common in the Neolithic; however, there is some evidence that they also used a primitive type of slow-turning potter's wheel, an innovation that did not become common in Europe until the Iron Age.

Characteristically, vessels were elaborately decorated with swirling patterns and intricate designs. Sometimes decorative incisions were added prior to firing, and sometimes these were filled with coloured dye to produce a dimensional effect. In the early period, the colours used to decorate pottery were limited to a rusty-red and white. Later, potters added additional colours to their products and experimented with more advanced ceramic techniques.

The pigments used to decorate ceramics were based on iron oxide for red hues, calcium carbonate, iron magnetite and manganese Jacobsite ores for black and calcium silicate for white. The black pigment, which was introduced during the later period of the culture, was a rare commodity: taken from a few sources and circulated (to a limited degree) throughout the region. The probable sources of these pigments were Iacobeni in Romania for the iron magnetite ore and Nikopol in Ukraine for the manganese Jacobsite ore.

No traces of the iron magnetite pigment mined in the easternmost limit of the Cucuteni–Trypillia region have been found to be used in ceramics from the western settlements, suggesting exchange throughout the entire cultural area was limited. In addition to mineral sources, pigments derived from organic materials (including bone and wood) were used to create various colours.

Pottery wheel reconstruction

Pottery wheel reconstruction

In the late period of Cucuteni–Trypillia culture, kilns with a controlled atmosphere were used for pottery production. These kilns were constructed with two separate chambers—the combustion chamber and the filling chamber— separated by a grate. Temperatures in the combustion chamber could reach 1000–1100 °C but were usually maintained at around 900 °C to achieve a uniform and complete firing of vessels.

Toward the end of the Cucuteni–Trypillia culture, as copper became more readily available, advances in ceramic technology levelled off as more emphasis was placed on developing metallurgical techniques.

=== Ceramic figurines ===
An anthropomorphic ceramic artefact was discovered during an archaeological dig in 1942 on Cetatuia Hill near Bodești, Neamț County, Romania, which became known as the "Cucuteni Frumusica Dance", after a nearby village of the same name. It was used as a support or stand, and upon its discovery was hailed as a symbolic masterpiece of Cucuteni–Trypillia culture. It is believed that the four stylised feminine silhouettes facing inward in an interlinked circle represented a hora, or ritualistic dance. Similar artefacts were later found in Berești and Drăgușeni.

Extant figurines excavated at the Cucuteni sites are thought to represent religious artifacts, but their meaning or use is still unknown. Some historians as Gimbutas claim that:

...the stiff nude to be representative of death on the basis that the color white is associated with the bone (that which shows after death). Stiff nudes can be found in Hamangia, Karanovo, and Cucuteni cultures

=== Textiles ===
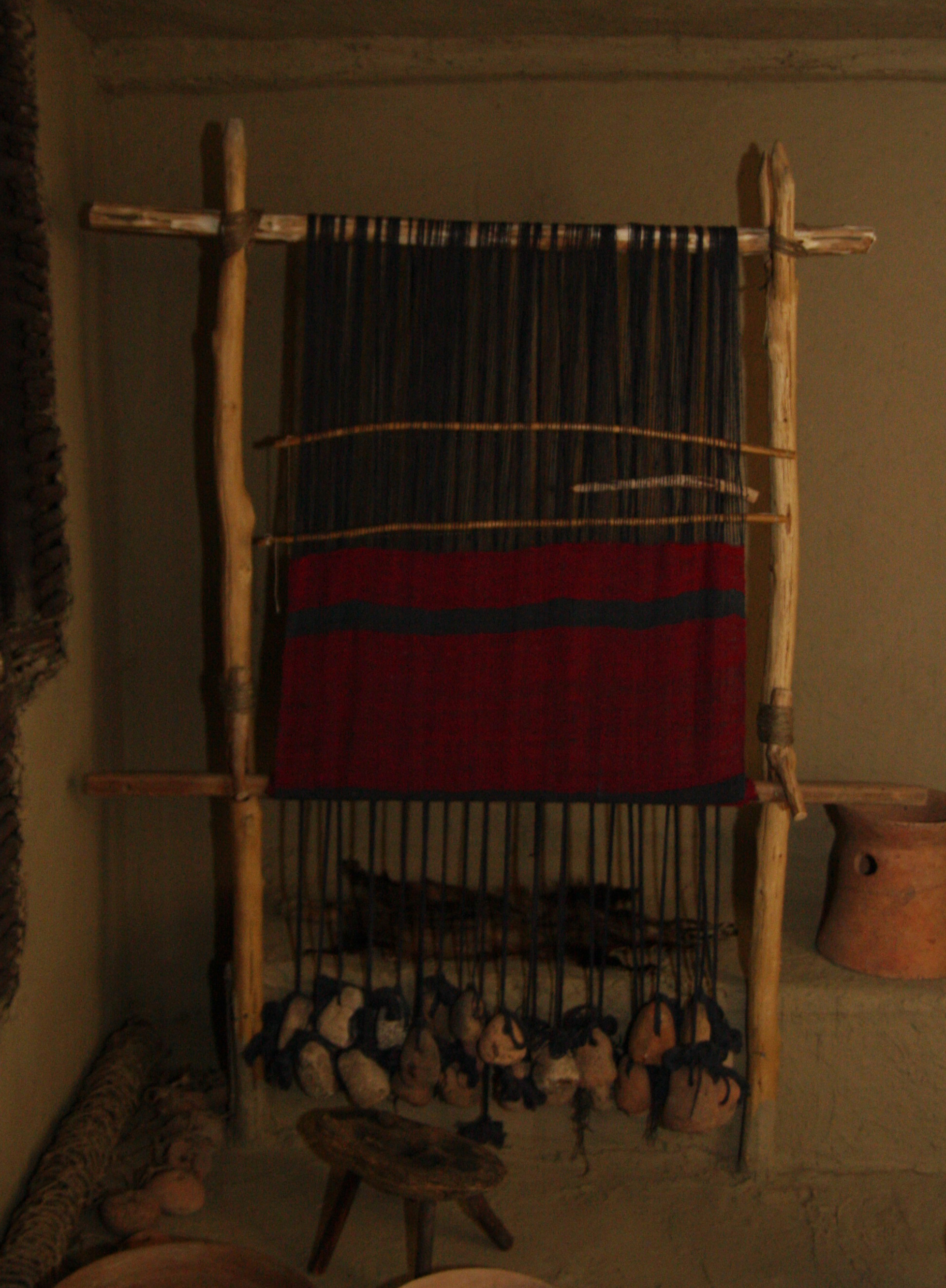
A reconstructed Cucuteni–Trypillia loom

No examples of Cucuteni–Trypillia textiles have yet been found – preservation of prehistoric textiles is rare and the region does not have a suitable climate. However, impressions of textiles are found on pottery sherds, because the clay was placed there before it was fired. These show that woven fabrics were common in Cucuteni–Trypillia society.

Finds of ceramic weights with drilled holes suggest that these were manufactured with a warp-weighted loom. It has been suggested that these weights, especially "disposable" examples made from poor quality clay and inadequately fired, were used to weigh down fishing nets. These would probably have been frequently lost, explaining their inferior quality.

Other pottery sherds with textile impressions, found at Frumușica and Cucuteni, suggest that textiles were also knitted (specifically using a technique known as nalbinding).

=== Weapons and tools ===
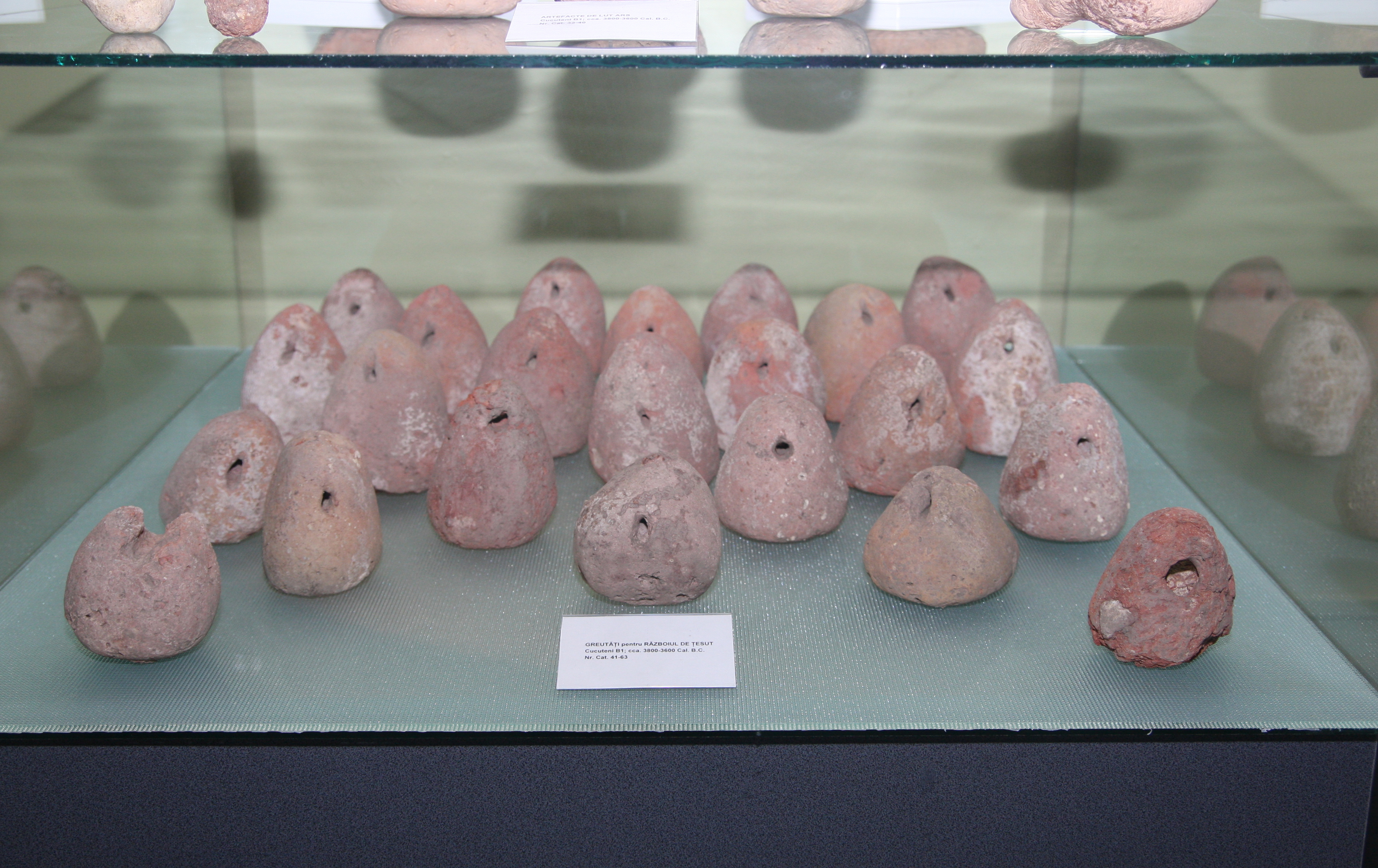
loom weights

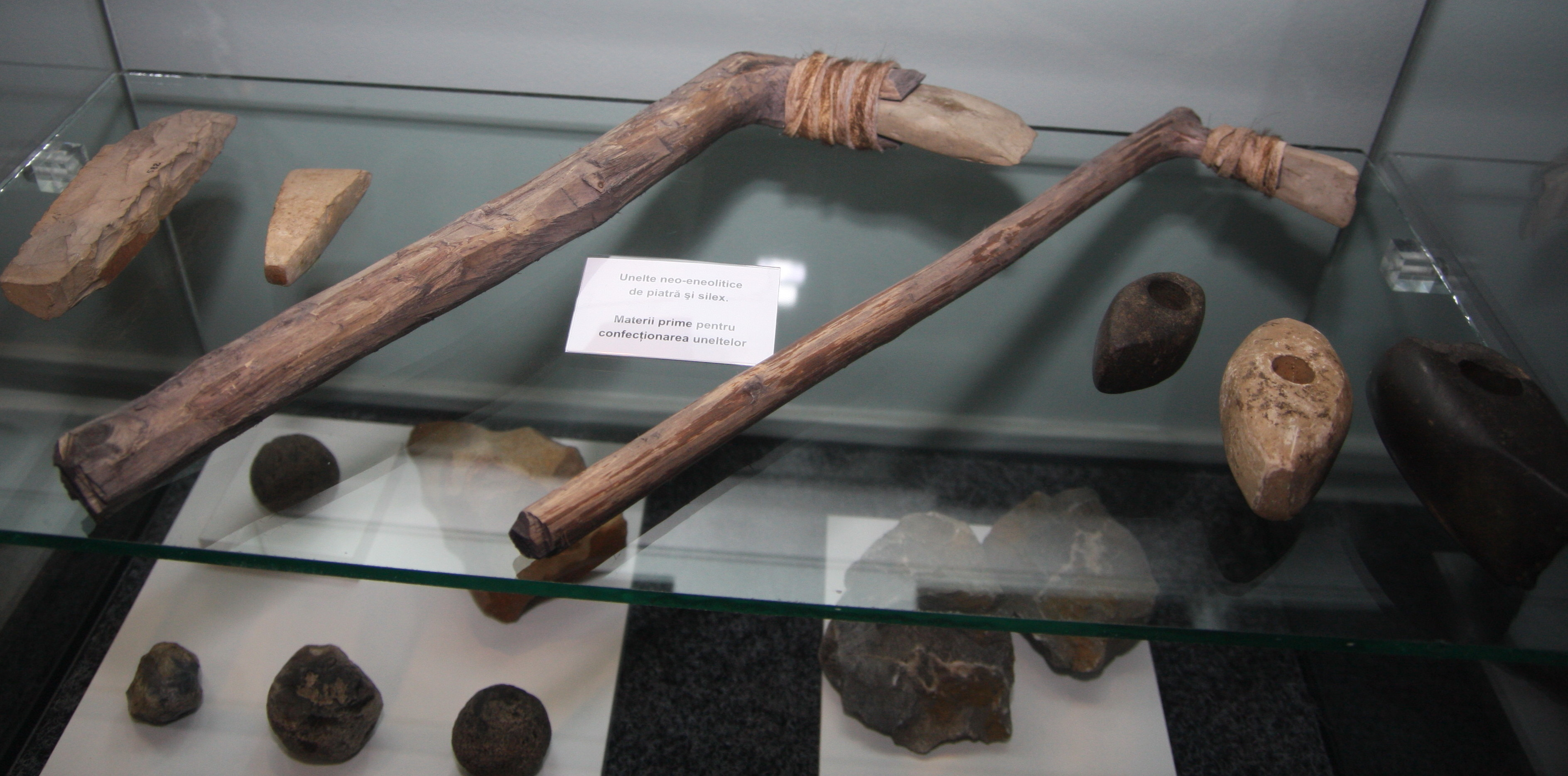
Stone tools

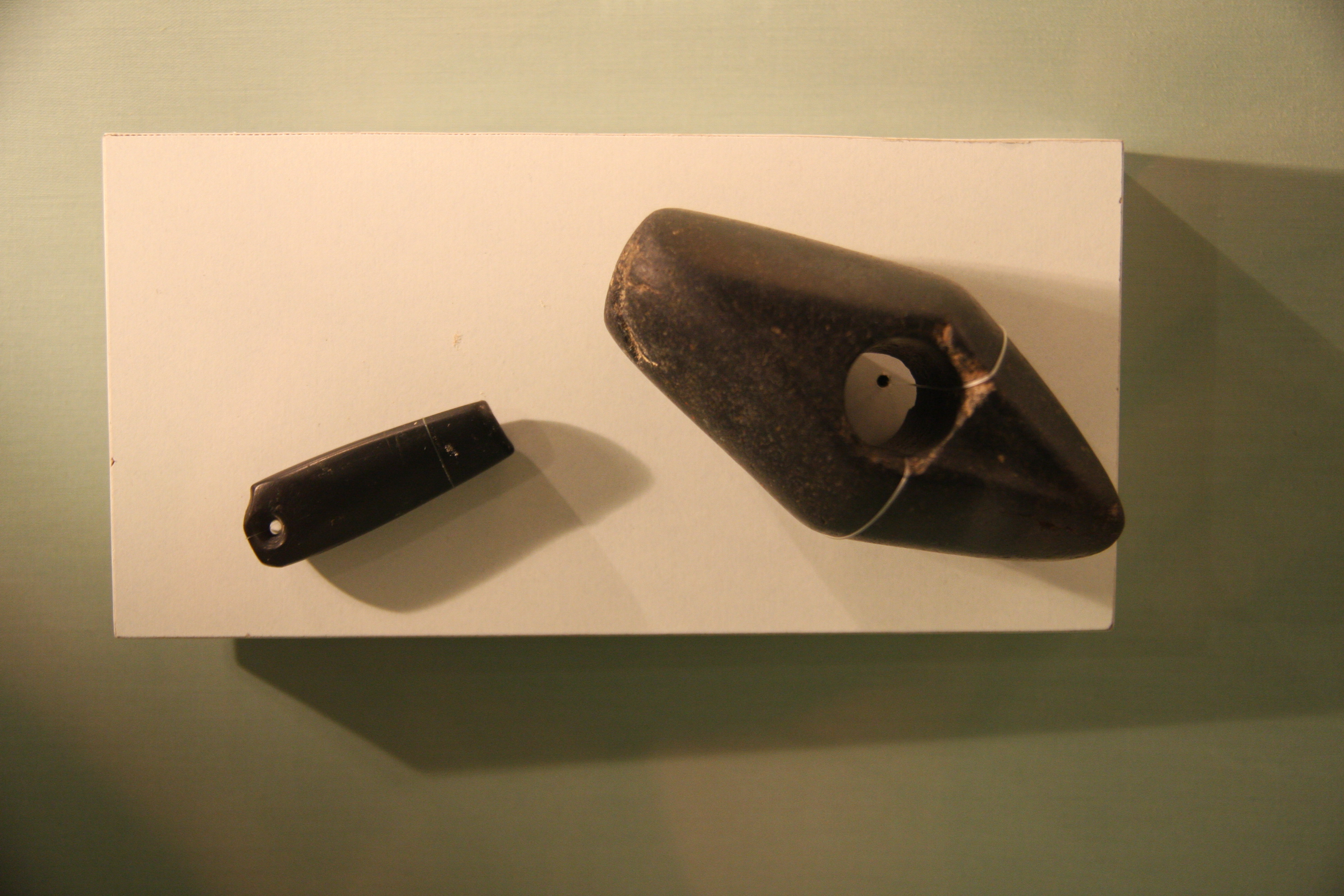
Stone tools

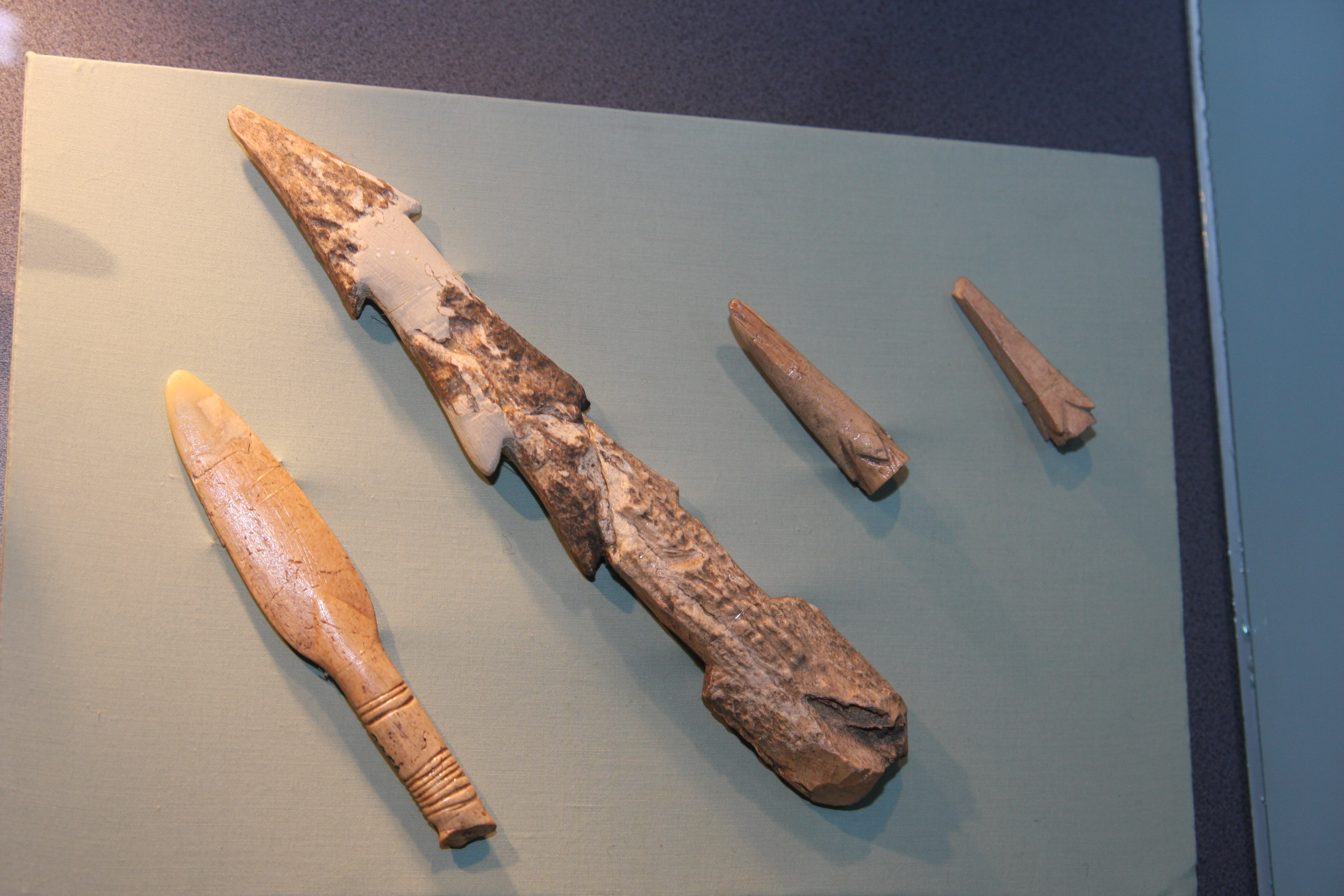
Bone artefacts

Cucuteni–Trypillia tools were made from knapped and polished stone, organic materials (bone, antler and horn), and in the later period, copper. Local Miorcani flint was the most common material for stone tools, but a number of other types are known to have been used, including chert, jasper and obsidian. Presumably these tools were hafted with wood, but this is not preserved. Weapons are rare but not unknown, implying the culture was relatively peaceful.

The following types of tools have been discovered at Cucuteni–Trypillia sites:

Tool		Typical materials
Woodworking	Adzes	Stone, flint, copper
Woodworking	Burins	Stone, flint, copper
Woodworking	Scrapers	Stone, flint, copper
Woodworking	Awls	Stone, antler, horn, copper
Woodworking	Gouges/chisels	Stone, bone
Lithic reduction	Pressure flaking tools, e.g. abrasive pieces, plungers, pressing and retouching tools	Stone
Lithic reduction	Anvils	Stone
Lithic reduction	Hammerstones	Stone
Lithic reduction	Soft hammers	Antler, horn
Lithic reduction	Polishing tools	Bone, stone
Textiles	Knitting needles	Bone
Textiles	Shuttles	Bone
Textiles	Sewing needles	Bone, copper
Textiles	Spindles and spindle whorls	Clay
Textiles	Loom weights	Clay
Farming	Hoes	Antler, horn
Farming	Ards	Antler, horn
Farming	Ground stones/metates and grinding slabs	Stone
Farming	Sickles	Flint pieces inlaid into antler or wood blades
Fishing	Harpoons	Bone
Fishing	Fish hooks	Bone, copper
Other/multipurpose	Axes, including double-headed axes, hammer axes and possible battle axes	Stone, copper
Other/multipurpose	Clubs	Stone
Other/multipurpose	Knives and daggers	Flint, bone, copper
Other/multipurpose	Arrow tips	Flint, bone
Other/multipurpose	Handles	Flint, bone
Other/multipurpose	Spatulas	Flint, bone

=== Wheels ===
Some researchers, e.g., Asko Parpola, an Indologist at the University of Helsinki in Finland, believe that the CT-culture used the wheel with wagons. Only miniature models of animals and cups on 4 wheels have been found, and they date to the first half of the fourth millennium BC. Such models are often thought to have been children's toys. Nevertheless, they convey the idea that objects could be pulled on wheels. Up to now there is no evidence for wheels used with real wagons.

== Ritual and religion ==
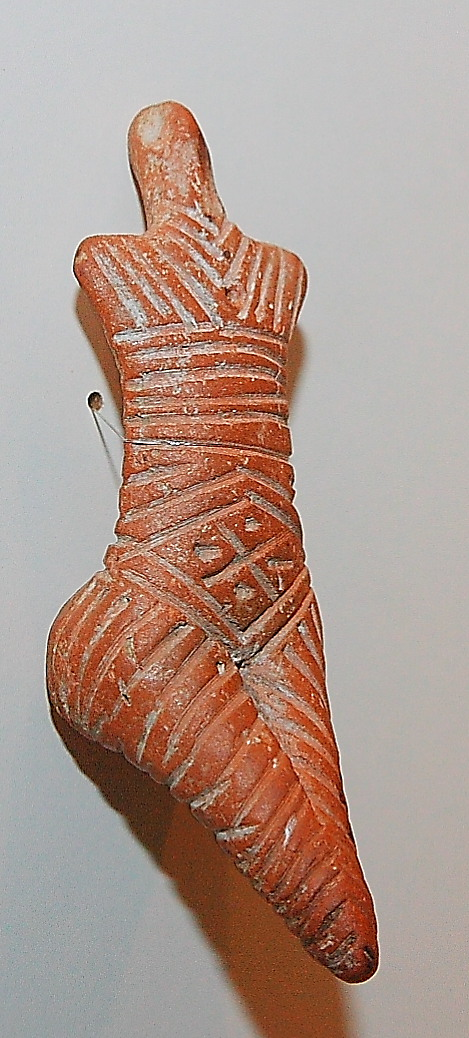
A typical Cucuteni–Trypillia clay "goddess" fetish

Some Cucuteni–Trypillia communities have been found that contain a special building located in the centre of the settlement, which archaeologists have identified as sacred sanctuaries. Artefacts have been found inside these sanctuaries, some of them having been intentionally buried in the ground within the structure, that are clearly of a religious nature, and have provided insights into some of the beliefs, and perhaps some of the rituals and structure, of the members of this society. Additionally, artefacts of an apparent religious nature have also been found within many domestic Cucuteni–Trypillia homes.

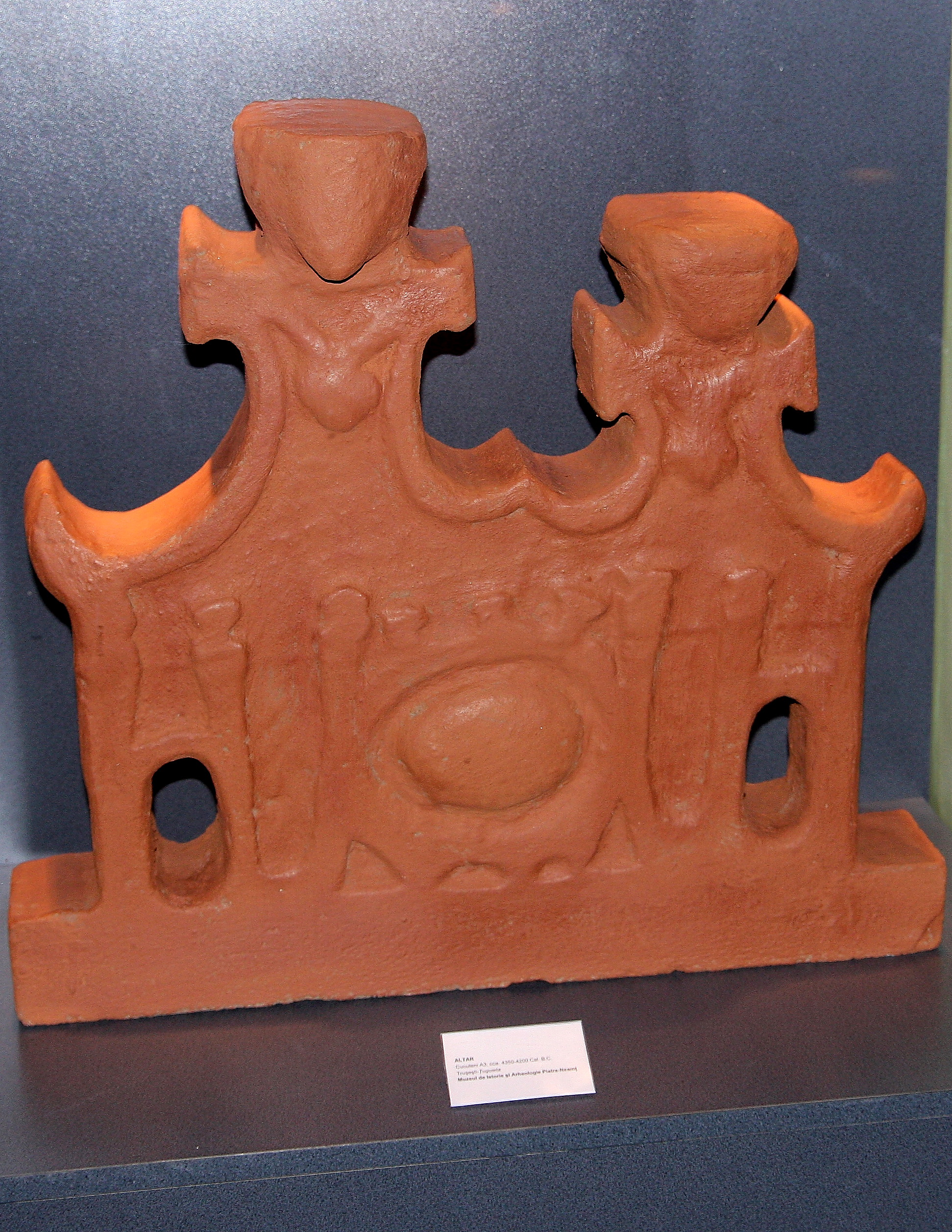
Ceramic altar (replica).

Many of these artefacts are clay figurines or statues. Archaeologists have identified many of these as fetishes or totems, which are believed to be imbued with powers that can help and protect the people who look after them. These Cucuteni–Trypillia figurines have become known popularly as goddesses. This term is not necessarily accurate for all female anthropomorphic clay figurines, as the archaeological evidence suggests that different figurines were used for different purposes, such as for protection, and so are not all representative of a goddess.

There have been a large amount of these figurines discovered in Cucuteni–Trypillia sites that many museums in eastern Europe have a sizable collection of them. As a result, they have come to represent one quickly identifiable visual marker of this culture

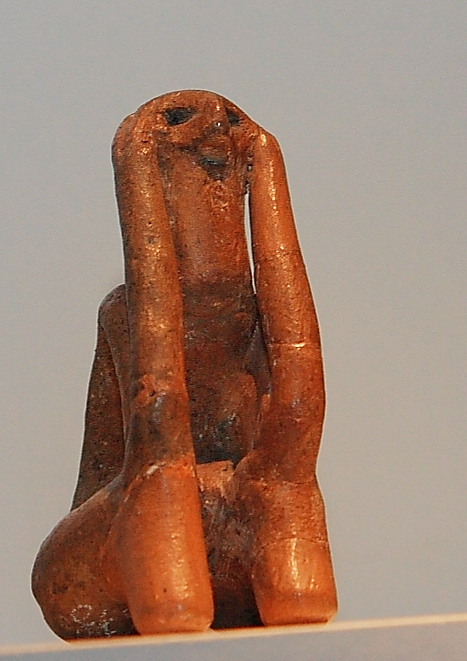
'The Thinker from Tarpesti', 4500 BC. Cucuteni Eneolithic Art Museum, Piatra Neamt, Moldavia

The archaeologist Marija Gimbutas based at least part of her Kurgan hypothesis and Old European culture theories on these Cucuteni–Trypillia clay figurines. Her conclusions, which were always controversial, today are discredited by many scholars, but still there are some scholars who support her theories about how neolithic societies were matriarchal, non-warlike, and worshipped an "earthy" mother goddess, but were subsequently wiped out by invasions of patriarchal Indo-European tribes who burst out of the steppes of Russia and Kazakhstan beginning around 2500 BC, and who worshipped a warlike Sky God.

Gimbutas' theories have been partially discredited by more recent discoveries and analyses. Today there are many scholars who disagree with Gimbutas, pointing to new evidence that suggests a much more complex society during the Neolithic era than she had been accounting for.

One of the unanswered questions regarding the Cucuteni–Trypillia culture is the small number of artefacts associated with funerary rites. Although very large settlements have been explored by archaeologists, the evidence for mortuary activity is almost invisible. Making a distinction between the eastern Trypillia and the western Cucuteni regions of the Cucuteni–Trypillia geographical area, American archaeologist Douglass W. Bailey writes:

There are no Cucuteni cemeteries and the Trypillia ones that have been discovered are very late.

Currently, the only Trypillian site where human remains dating to the first half of the 4th millennium BC have been consistently found is Verteba Cave in west Ukraine. The discovery of skulls is more frequent than other parts of the body, however because there has not yet been a comprehensive statistical survey done of all of the skeletal remains discovered at Cucuteni–Trypillia sites, precise post excavation analysis of these discoveries cannot be accurately determined at this time. Still, many questions remain concerning these issues, as well as why there seems to have been no male remains found at all. The only definite conclusion that can be drawn from archaeological evidence is that in the Cucuteni–Trypillia culture, in the vast majority of cases, the bodies were not formally deposited within the settlement area.

== Archaeogenetics ==
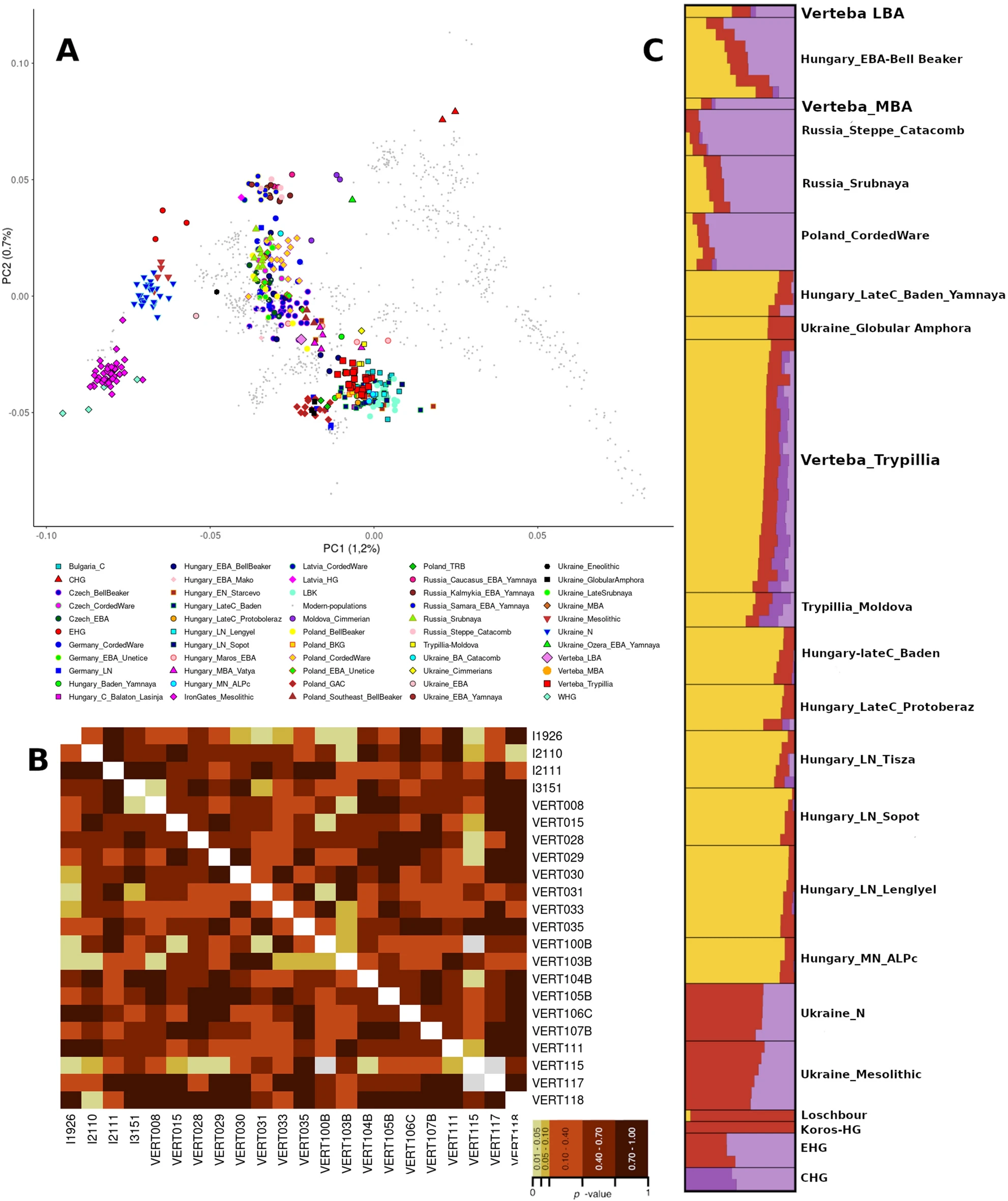
"(A) PCA built with modern European populations in which Neolithic and Bronze Age populations of Eastern Europe have been projected. It is observed that the Verteba_Trypillia individuals are located within the European Neolithic populations genetic diversity (B) ADMIXTURE analysis of the most representative populations included in the analysis (K = 4). The different colors represent the source ancestries of the studied individuals: Yellow represents Anatolia_N related ancestry, Red represents WHG related ancestry and the purple colors represent Steppe related ancestries, each individual is represented by the proportions of these ancestries" per Gelabert et al. 2022.

While the number of known settlements is large and single settlements alone most probably could have been home for more than 10,000 inhabitants, to date only from 1061 individuals are skeletal remains preserved. Important sites are the settlement of Kosenivka and the Verteba Cave. The former yielded evidence for the traumata, diseases, and social structures, however the assemblage did not yield sufficient DNA material for further analysis.

In 2010, the first archaeogenetic analysis of Trypillian remains was conducted by Nikitin et al. They analyzed mtDNA recovered from Cucuteni–Trypillia human osteological remains found in the Verteba Cave (on the bank of the Seret River, Ternopil Oblast, Ukraine). It revealed that seven of the individuals whose remains where analysed belonged to: two to haplogroup HV(xH), two to haplogroup H, one to haplogroup R0(xHV), one to haplogroup J and one to haplogroup T4, the latter also being the oldest sample of the set.

The authors conclude that the population living around Verteba Cave was fairly heterogenous, but that the wide chronological age of the specimens might indicate that the heterogeneity might have been due to natural population flow during this timeframe. The authors also link the R0(xHV) and HV(xH) haplogroups with European Paleolithic populations, and consider the T4 and J haplogroups as hallmarks of Neolithic demic intrusions from the southeast (the north-pontic region) rather than from the west (i.e. the Linear Pottery culture).

In 2017, Nikitin et al. presented mtDNA data of eight additional individuals from Verteba Cave, seven of them dating to the Trypillian period and one dating to the Iron Age. The Trypillia-age individuals carried haplogroups H, HV, HV0, H5a, as well as T2b, U8b1b, and U8b1a2. The authors linked H5a, T2b and U8b1 with Anatolian Neolithic Farmers (ANFs) and Early Neolithic Farmers of Europe (ENFs) influence on Trypillian population at Verteba. Since the representatives of the H clade of mtDNA comprised 28.6% of the sample, authors suggested a genetic link between the Trypillian population at Verteba and the Funnel Beaker culture groups, which displayed similar frequencies of H-bearing haplotypes.

A 2018 study by Mathiesson et al., published in Nature, included a whole-genome analysis of four males from the Nikitin et al., 2017 study, and described them as roughly 80% EEF, with around 20% of the rest of their ancestry being intermediate between EHG and WHG. With respect to Y-DNA, two carried haplogroup G2a2b2a (G-CTS688 and G-PF3330), while one carried G2a-PF3141 and one E-CTS10894. With respect to mtDNA, they carried H5a, T2b, HV and U8b1b. According to admixture analysis they had approximately 75% EEF, 10% both Western and Eastern Hunter-Gatherer and less than 5% traces of Yamnaya-related ancestry.

In 2020 Immel et al. published a study of four unrelated females from two late CTCC period sites in Moldova. They carried mtDNA haplogroup K1a1, T1a, T2c1d1, U4a1 and "all individuals carried a large Neolithic-derived ancestry component and were genetically more closely related to Linear Pottery than to Anatolian farmers. Three of the specimens also showed considerable amounts of steppe-related ancestry, suggesting influx into the CTCC gene-pool from people affiliated with the steppe populations of the North Pontic. The authors conclude that "...the steppe component arrived in eastern Europe farming communities maybe as early as 3500 BCE".

A 2022 study published in Scientific Reports analyzed 18 individuals from Verteba Cave in Ukraine some of which have been reported in previous studies. With respect to Y-DNA haplogroup, three carried G2a2b2a3, two G2a2a1a, one G2a2a1, G2a2a1a3, C1a, I2a1a2a-L161.1, I2a2a1, and I2c, while mtDNA haplogroup, two J1c2, K1a2, T2b and one H, H15a1, H40, J1c5, K1a1b1, K1b1, N1a1a1a, T2, T2c1d1, U5a and U5a2. According to admixture analysis, all studied Ukrainian Trypillian samples "are mostly defined by the ancestral component dominant in Anatolia-Neolithic individuals, which suggests a strong relationship with European Neolithic populations, similar to previous studies. However, these samples also show the presence of steppe EHG, CHG, and WHG components as described in Mathiesson et al., with the exception of one individual (I3151), who seems to be absent of any EHG/CHG ancestry". Phenotypically, all were lactose intolerant and almost all had a mutation associated with blue eyes.

According to the paper, it indicates shared ancestry with the population of Baden culture, "in conclusion, the results show that Verteba Cave represents a significant mortuary site that connects East and West. The genetic structure of the CTCC peoples includes ancestry related to both earlier hunter-gatherers from the west and farmers from the Near East, and one that is genetically distinct from those of Moldovan CTCC peoples. The lack of local ancestry associated with Ukrainian Neolithic hunter-gatherers suggests that these farmers mostly replaced local foragers. Additionally, during the Bronze Age, Verteba Cave was used by successive waves of nomadic pastoralists from the east that eventually brought significant genetic and cultural changes to Europe that eventually mixed with the local descendants of Trypillia-culture population".

In a 2023 study, individuals who have steppe-related ancestry can be explained by the increase of EHG-rich ancestry.

== Archaeological finds ==
In 2026, archaeologists excavating the prehistoric settlement of Stăuceni-Holm in Botoşani county in northeastern Romania uncovered a large communal building associated with the Cucuteni–Trypillia culture. The structure covers around 350 square metres, making it more than three times larger than the surrounding dwellings within a settlement of about 45 houses. Geophysical surveys and excavations revealed foundation ditches, large postholes, and a substantial clay floor, while the absence of domestic features such as cooking or storage installations distinguished it from ordinary residences. Archaeologists recovered pottery fragments, lithic remains, charred grains, and seeds of black henbane, but found no evidence of elite occupation or specialized household activities. The building is therefore interpreted as a communal or public structure that may have served as a meeting place, ceremonial space, or location for collective activities. According to the researchers, the discovery contributes to research on the social organization of Cucuteni–Trypillia communities and indicates that large communal buildings were present not only in major settlements but also in smaller communities.

== See also ==
- Barter tokens of the Cucuteni–Trypillia culture
- Chalcolithic Europe
- Copper Age
- Dnieper–Donets culture
- History of Ukraine
- Khvalynsk culture
- Linear Pottery culture
- Nebelivka (archaeological site)
- Neolithic Europe
- Old Europe (archaeology)
- Prehistoric Romania
- Prehistory of Southeastern Europe
- Proto-Indo-Europeans
- Samara culture
- Sredny Stog culture
- Varna culture
- Vinča culture
- Yamnaya culture

== Notes ==
=== Works cited ===
- Gimbutas, Marija (1982), "Old Europe in the Fifth Millenium B.C.: The European Situation on the Arrival of Indo-Europeans", in Polomé, Edgar C. (ed.), The Indo-Europeans in the Fourth and Third Millennia, Ann Arbor: Karoma Publishers, ISBN 0-89720-041-1
- Gimbutas, Marija (1997), Dexter, Miriam Robbins; Jones-Bley, Karlene (eds.), The Kurgan Culture and the Indo-Europeanization of Europe: Selected Articles from 1952 to 1993, Journal of Indo-European Studies Monograph Series, vol. 18, Washington, DC: Institute for the Study of Man, ISBN 978-0-941694-56-8

== Bibliography ==
English

- Bailey, Douglass Whitfield, Prehistoric figurines: representation and corporeality in the Neolithic. London; New York, Routledge, 2005. ISBN 0-415-33151-X OCLC 56686499
- Bailey, Douglass Whitfield; Whittle, Alasdair W.R.; Cummings, Vicki, eds. (Un)settling the neolithic. Oxford: Oxbow, 2005. ISBN 1-84217-179-8 OCLC 62472378
- Bartel, Brad, "Cultural associations and mechanisms of change in anthropomorphic figurines during the Neolithic in the eastern Mediterranean basin". World archaeology 13, no. 1 (1981): pp. 73–86. Abingdon, UK: Routledge Journals ISSN 0043-8243 OCLC 2243103
- Chapman, John Fragmentation in archaeology: People, places, and broken objects in the prehistory of south eastern Europe. London: Routledge, 2000. ISBN 0-415-15803-6 OCLC 41886018
- Ciuk, Krzysztof, ed. Mysteries of ancient Ukraine: the remarkable Trypilian (sic) culture, 5400–2700 BC. Toronto: Royal Ontario Museum, 2008. ISBN 978-0-88854-465-0 OCLC 267124474
- Drasovean, Florian; Popovici, Dragomir; Alamoreanu, Aledandru; Wullschleger, Manuela; Chamay, Jacques; van der Wielen-van Ommeren, Frederike. Neolithic art in Romania. Catalog for the exhibition held at the Historisches Museum in Olten, Switzerland, 3 June – 5 October 2008; Naples, Italy: arte'm, 2008. ISBN 978-88-569-0001-9 OCLC 260224420
- Ellis, Linda. The Cucuteni–Tripolye culture: study in technology and the origins of complex society. Volume 217 of the BAR international series; British Archaeological Reports (B.A.R): Oxford, 1984. ISBN 0-86054-279-3 OCLC 11385722
- Fuchs, K., Hofmann, R., Shatilo, L., Schlütz, F., Storch, S., Chabanyuk, V., Kirleis, W., Müller, J. 2024. Life and death in Trypillia times: Interdisciplinary analyses of the unique human remains from the settlement of Kosenivka, Ukraine (3700–3600 BCE). PlosOne 19(12):e0289769. https://doi.org/10.1371/journal.pone.0289769 .
- Hofmann, R., Kirleis, W., Müller, J., Rud, V., Ţerna, S. †, Videiko, M. 2024. From Ros to Prut. Transformations of Trypillia settlements. Sidestone Press: Leiden. ISBN 9789464270723 https://www.sidestone.com/books/from-ros-to-prut-volume-1
- Immel, Alexander (6 March 2020). "Gene-flow from steppe individuals into Cucuteni-Trypillia associated populations indicates long-standing contacts and gradual admixture". Scientific Reports. 10 (4253) 4253. Nature Research. Bibcode:2020NatSR..10.4253I. doi:10.1038/s41598-020-61190-0. PMC 7060214. PMID 32144348.
- Lazarovici, Cornelia-Magda (2005). "Anthropomorphic statuettes from Cucuteni–Tripolye: some signs and symbols". Documenta Praehistorica. 32: 145–154. doi:10.4312/dp.32.10. OCLC 442196598.
- Makkay, János. Early stamp seals in South-east Europe. Budapest: Akadémiai Kiadó, 1984. ISBN 963-05-3424-X OCLC 11436956
- Mallory, James P. "Tripolye culture". Encyclopedia of Indo-European Culture, J. P. Mallory and D. Q. Adams (eds.), Chicago: Fitzroy Dearborn, 1997. ISBN 1-884964-98-2 OCLC 37931209
- Mantu, Cornelia-Magda; Dumitroaia, Gheorghe; Tsaravopoulos, Aris, eds. Cucuteni: the last great Chalcolithic civilization of Europe. Catalog of an exhibit co-hosted by the Romanian Ministry of Culture, the Romanian Academy and the Hellenic Ministry of Culture, held at the Archaeological Museum of Thessaloniki, 21 September – 31 December 1997 – the English version of the catalog by Bogdan Stefanescu; Athena, Greece: Hypourgeio Politismou, 1997. ISBN 973-98191-6-8 OCLC 480166927
- Mathieson, Iain (21 February 2018). "The Genomic History of Southeastern Europe". Nature. 555 (7695). Nature Research: 197–203. Bibcode:2018Natur.555..197M. doi:10.1038/nature25778. PMC 6091220. PMID 29466330.
- Ohlrau, René (2020). Maidanets'ke. Development and decline of a Trypillia mega-site in Central Ukraine. Leiden: Sidestone Press, 2020. ISBN 9789088908484. https://doi.org/10.59641/h0912kt
- Ohlrau, René (2022). Trypillia Mega-Sites: Neither Urban nor Low-Density? Journal of Urban Archaeology, 5, 81-100. https://doi.org/10.1484/J.JUA.5.129844
- Renfrew, Colin. Problems in European prehistory: a collection of 18 papers, each with a new introduction and bibliography, and an original introductory essay. Edinburgh: Edinburgh University Press, 1979. ISBN 0-85224-355-3 OCLC 6092588
- Shatilo, Liudmyla (2021). Tripolye Typo-Chronology: Mega and Smaller Sites in the Sinyukha River Basin. Leiden: Sidestone Press. ISBN 9789088909511 https://doi.org/10.59641/m5457py
- Skeates, Robin (2007). "Neolithic stamps: cultural patterns, processes and potencies" (PDF). Cambridge Archaeological Journal. 17 (2): 183–198. doi:10.1017/S0959774307000248. OCLC 48477793. S2CID 162937371.
- Taylor, Timothy. "Aspects of settlement diversity and its classification in southeast Europe before the Roman period". World Archaeology 19, no.1 (1987) pp. 1–22. Abingdon, UK: Routledge Journals ISSN 0043-8243 OCLC 2243103
- The Tripolye Culture giant-settlements in Ukraine. Formation, Development and Decline. F. Menotti, A. Korvin-Piotrovsky ed.; Oxford: Oxbow Books, 2012
- Sherratt, Andrew. Economy and society in prehistoric Europe: changing perspectives. Princeton, N.J.: Princeton University Press, 1997. ISBN 0-691-01697-6 OCLC 36695149
- Stratulat, Lacramioara, ed. Cucuteni–Trypilla: a great civilization of old Europe; Palazzo della Cancelleria, Rome–Vatican, 16 September – 31 October 2008. Catalog for an exhibit held at the Palazzo della Cancelleria museum in Vatican City from 16 September – 31 October 2008; Palazzo della Cancelleria: Rome–Vatican, 2008. ISBN 978-973-0-05830-7 OCLC 481221536
- Mykhailo Videiko Ukraine: from Trypillia to Rus. Kiev, Krion, 2010
- Whittle, Alasdair W. R. Europe in the Neolithic: the creation of new worlds. Part of the Cambridge world archaeology series (revised edition of Neolithic Europe, 1985); Cambridge: Cambridge University Press, 1996. ISBN 0-521-44476-4 OCLC 32510827
- Wilson, Andrew. The Ukrainians: unexpected nation. New Haven: Yale University Press, 2000. ISBN 0-300-08355-6 OCLC 43985470

French

- Chapman, John; Dumitroaia, Gheorghe; Weller, Olivier; et al, eds. Cucuteni: 120 ans de recherches. Le temps du bilan = 120 years of research: time to sum up. Volume 16 of the Bibliotheca memoriae antiquitatis series (Papers originally presented at a conference co-hosted by the Cucuteni Culture International Research Centre in Piatra-Neamț, and the Institute of Archaeology in Iași, on 21–24 Oct 2004 in Piatra Neamț, Romania); Piatra-Neamț, Romania: Constantin Matasa, 2005. ISBN 973-7777-02-6 OCLC 243473152

German

- Ohlrau, René, Tripolje Großsiedlungen - Geomagnetische Prospektion und architektursoziologische Perspektiven. Journal of Neolithic Archaeology 17, 2015, pp. 17–99. https://doi.org/10.12766/jna.2015.3
- Schmidt, Hubert. Cucuteni in der oberen Moldau, Rumänien: die befestigte Siedlung mit bemalter Keramik von der Steinkupferzeit bis in die vollentwickelte Bronzezeit. Berlin–Leipzig: W. de Gruyter, 1932. OCLC 4942033
- Haarmann, Harald. Das Rätsel der Donauzivilisation. Die Entdeckung der ältesten Hochkultur Europas. München: C.H.Beck, 2011.

Romanian

- Dumitrescu, V. Arta culturii Cucuteni. București: Editura Meridiane, 1979
- Biblioteca Antiquitatis, The first Cucuteni Museum of Romania Foton, 2005
- Studia Antiqua et Archaeologica, IX, Iași, 2003 The Human Bone with Possible Marks of Human Teeth Found at Liveni Site (Cucuteni Culture) Sergiu Haimovici
- Marius Alexianu, Gheorghe Dumitroaia and Dan Monah, The Exploitation of the Salt-Water Sources in Moldavia: an Ethno-Archaeological Approach, in (eds.) D. Monah, Gh. Dumitroaia, O. Weller et J. Chapman, L'exploitation du sel à travers le temps, BMA, XVIII, Piatra-Neamt, 2007, pp. 279–298
- Cucoș, Ștefan (1999). "Faza Cucuteni B în zona subcarpatică a Moldovei (Cucuteni B period in the lower Carpathian region of Moldova)". BMA: Bibliotheca Memoriae Antiquitatis (Memorial Library Antiquities). 6. Piatra Neamț, Romania: Muzeul de Istorie Piatra Neamț (Piatra Neamț Museum of History). OCLC 223302267. Archived from the original on 9 October 2010.

Russian

- Археология Украинской ССР, Киев, 1985, т.1
- Бибиков С. Раннетрипольское поселение Лука-Врублевецкая на Днестре. МИА н. 38. М. — П. 1953.
- Збенович В. Г. Позднетрипольские племена Северного Причерноморья / АН УССР. НА. – К.: Наук. думка, 1974.
- Збенович В. Г. Ранний этап трипольской культуры на территории Украины / АН УССР. ИА. – К.: Наук. думка, 1989.
- Круц В. А. Позднетрипольские племена Среднего Поднепровья. – Киев: Наукова думка, 1977.
- Маркевич В. И. Позднетрипольские племена Северной Молдавии. – Кишинев: Штиинца, 1981.
- Пассек Т. Раннеземледельческие (трипольские) племена Поднестровья, МИА, н. 84. Москва, 1961.
- Пассек Т. Периодизация трипольских поселений. МИА, н. 10. М. — П. 1949.
- Рыбаков Б. А., Космогония и мифология земледельцев энеолита // Советская археология, 1965, № 1—2.
- Рындина Н. В. Древнейшее металлообрабатывающее производство Восточной Европы, М., 1971.
- Хвойко В. Каменный век Среднего Поднепровья // Труды одиннадцатого археологического сьезда в Киеве. І. Киев, 1901.
- Трипольская культура в Украине. Поселение-гигант Тальянки. – Киев, 2008
- Черныш Е. К., К истории населения энеолитического времени в Среднем Приднестровье // Неолит и энеолит юга Европейской части СССР, Москва, 1962.
- Черниш Е. К. Энеолит Правобережной Украины и Молдавии // Энеолит СССР. – М., 1982. – С. 166—347.

Ukrainian

- Бібіков С. Трипільська культура. Археологія Української РСР, т. І. Київ, 1971.
- Дослідження трипільської цивілізації у науковій спадщині археолога Вікентія Хвойки. – Київ: Академперіодика, 2007. – Частини І—ІІ
- Дудкін В. П. Відейко М. Ю. Архітектура Трипільської цивілізації: від поселень до протоміст. – Київ: Мислене древо, 2009.
- Енциклопедія Трипільської цивілізації, Київ, Укрполіграфмедіа, 2004, т. І—ІІ.
- Захарук Ю. Пізній етап трипільської культури. Археологія Української РСР, т. I. Київ, 1971.
- Пастернак Я. Археологія України. Торонто, 1961.
- Ткачук Т. М. Семіотичний аналіз трипільсько-кукутенських знакових систем (мальований посуд) / Ткачук Т. М., Мельник Я. Г.; Національний заповідник "Давній Галич"; Прикарпатський ун-т ім. В.Стефаника. – Івано-Франківськ: Плай, 2000.
- Трипільська культура, т. І, АН УРСР, Інститут Археології. Київ, 1940.
- Цвек О. В. Поселення східнотрипільської культури (короткий нарис). – Київ, 2006.
- Черниш К. Ранньотрипільське поселення Ленківці на Середньому Дністрі. АН УРСР, Інститут Археології. Київ, 1959.
