= Baden culture =

Copper Age culture in south-central Europe (c. 3520–2690 BC)

- Geographical range: East-Central Europe
- Period: Chalcolithic, Bronze Age
- Dates: c. 3520–2690 BC
- Major sites: Vucedol
- Preceded by: Lengyel culture, Bodrogkeresztúr culture, Coțofeni culture, Cernavodă culture, Funnelbeaker culture, Sopot culture
- Followed by: Vučedol culture, Bell Beaker culture, Nagyrév culture

The Baden culture or Baden-Pécel culture is a Chalcolithic to early Bronze Age archaeological culture dating to c. 3520–2690 BC. It is found in Central and Southeast Europe, and is in particular known from Moravia (Czech Republic), Romania, Hungary, southern Poland, Slovakia, northern Croatia and eastern Austria. Imports of Baden pottery have also been found in Germany and Switzerland (Arbon-Bleiche III). It is often grouped together with the Coțofeni culture as part of the Baden-Coțofeni culture.

== History of research ==
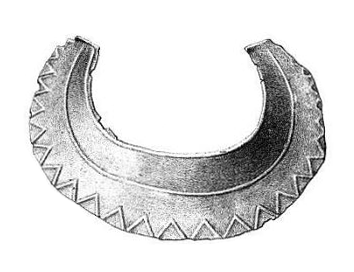
Copper pectoral, Czech Republic

The Baden culture was named after Baden bei Wien by the Austrian prehistorian Oswald Menghin. It is also known as the Ossarn group or Pecel culture. The first monographic treatment was produced by J. Banner in 1956. Other important scholars are E. Neustupny, Ida Bognar-Kutzian and Vera Nemejcova-Pavukova.

Baden has been interpreted as part of a much larger archaeological complex encompassing cultures at the mouth of the Danube (Ezero-Cernavodă III) and the Troad. In 1963, Nándor Kalicz had proposed a connection between the Baden culture and Troy, based on the anthropomorphic urns from Ózd-Centre (Hungary). This interpretation cannot be maintained in the face of radiocarbon dates. The author himself (2004) has called this interpretation a "cul-de-sac", based on a misguided historical methodology.

== Chronology ==
Baden developed out of the late Lengyel culture in the western Carpathian Basin. Němejcová-Pavuková proposes a polygenetic origin, including southeastern elements transmitted by the Ezero culture of the early Bronze Age (Ezero, layers XIII-VII) and Cernavodă III/Coțofeni. Ecsedy parallelises Baden with Early Helladic II in Thessaly, Parzinger with Sitagroi IV. Baden was approximately contemporaneous with the late Funnelbeaker culture, the Globular Amphora culture and the early Corded Ware culture. The following phases are known: Balaton-Lasinya, Baden-Boleráz, Post-Boleráz (divided into early, Fonyod/Tekovský Hrádok and late, Červený Hrádok/Szeghalom-Dioér by Vera Němejcová-Pavuková) and classical Baden.

Phase	Subgroups	Date	sites
Balaton-Lasinya	-	3700 BC cal	-
Boleráz	-	3500 BC	Pilismarot
Ia	Štúrovo	-	Letkès
Ib	Nitriansky Hrádok	-	Lánycsok, Vysoki breh
Ic	Zlkovce	-	Balatonboglár
Post-Boleraz		-	
early	Fonyod/Tekovský Hrádok	-	-
late	Červený Hrádok/Szeghalom-Dioér	-	-
Classical Baden		3400 BC	-
II, III	older	-	Nevidzany, Viss
IV	younger	-	Uny, Chlaba, Ózd

For radiocarbon dates: Horváth, Tünde & Svingor, Éva & Molnár, Mihály. (2008). New Radiocarbon Dates for the Baden Culture. Radiocarbon. 50. 447-458. 10.1017/S0033822200053546.

== Settlement ==
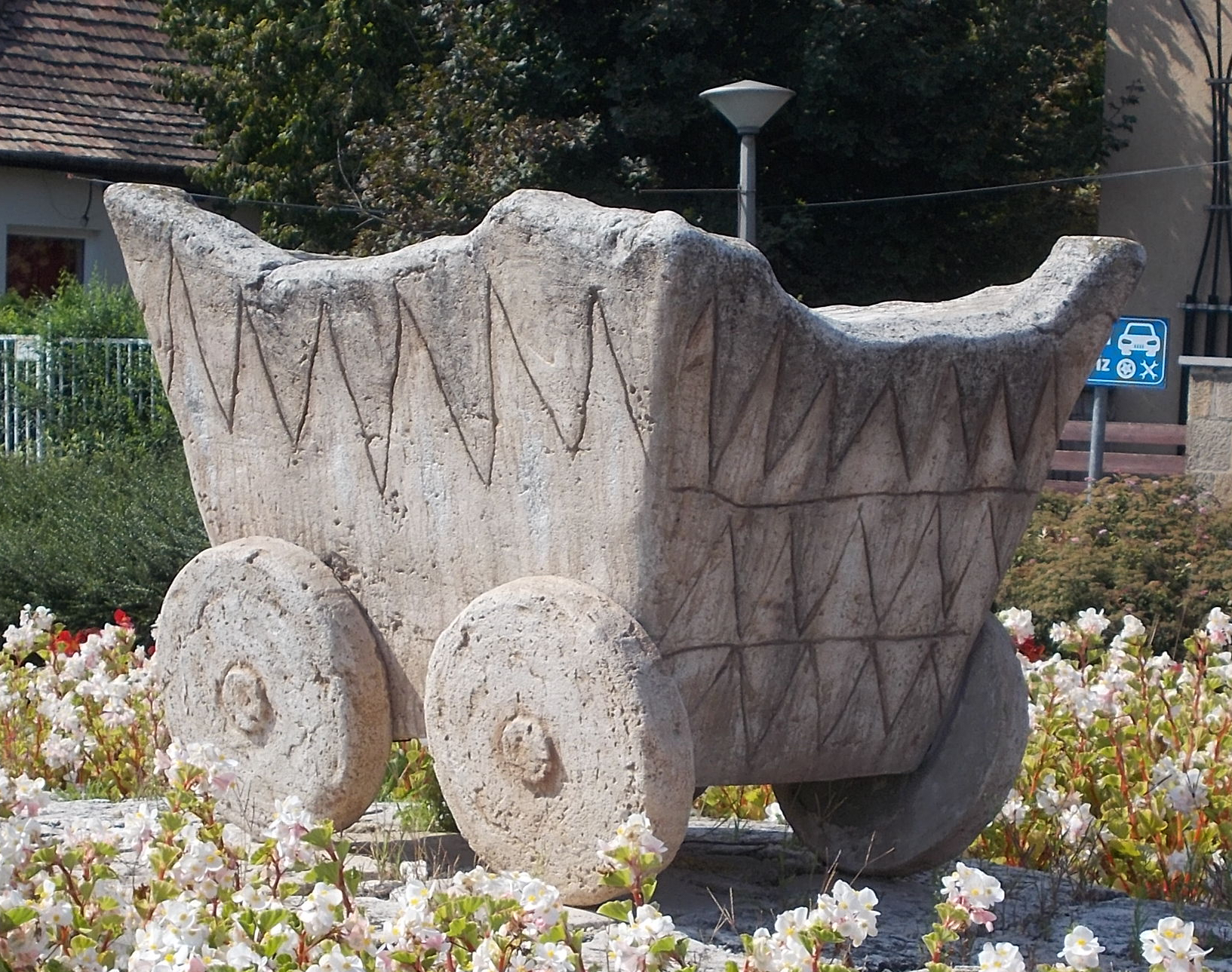
Modern sculpture of a Baden culture wagon/cart model dating from c. 3300 BC, Hungary.

Before the Baden culture, there was no culture that was centralized in the Carpathian Basin and completely filled it, but the Baden-Pécel culture transcends the Carpathian Basin, which proves that it was a populous and unified culture. It can be observed that in the centre of some settlements, a larger building was constructed, and crown-like decorations were also found in some cemeteries, perhaps indicating that a kind of patronage society was characteristic of the culture.

Examining the Balatonőszöd artefacts, archaeologists have concluded that although the settlements were large, they were seasonal "towns", and their inhabitants were constantly changing. This would explain why we find such a high number of settlements linked to the culture. However, the archaeological evidence shows that there were also settlements that were fortified and served as a kind of centre, and were permanently inhabited. These settlements were mainly found on hilltops.

== Economy ==
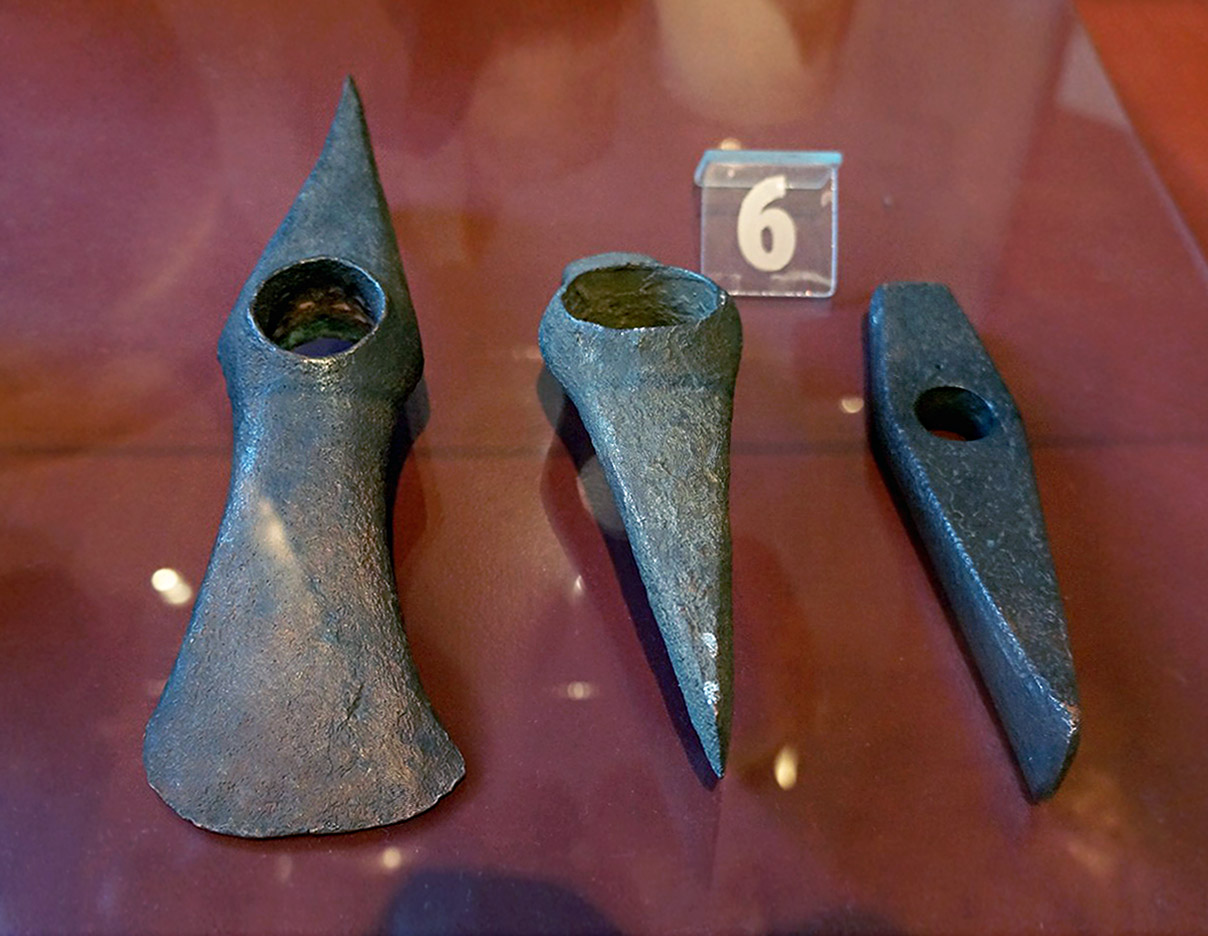
Bronze axes, Serbia

The economy was mixed. Full-scale agriculture was present, along with the keeping of domestic stock—pigs, goats, etc. The Baden, Ezero, Usatovo, and Cernavoda cultures represent a cultural complex that marks the transition from the Chalcolithic to the Early Bronze Age with the production of arsenical bronze in the second half of the fourth millennium BC.

=== Wheeled Wagons ===
The Baden culture has some of the earliest attestation of often wheeled, wagon-shaped models in pottery, sometimes with a handle. There are burials of pairs of cattle that have been interpreted as draft animals. Though there are no finds of actual wagons, some scholars take these finds together as proof for the presence of real wagons.

== Burial ==
Both inhumations and cremations are known. In Slovakia and Hungary, the burned remains were often placed in anthropomorphic urns (Slána, Ózd-Center). In Nitriansky Hrádok, a mass grave was uncovered. There are also burials of cattle. Up to now, the only cemetery known from the early Boleráz-phase is Pilismarót (Hungary), which also contained a few examples of stroke-ornamented pottery.

In Serbia, anthropomorphic urns have been found in the towns of Dobanovci, Gomolava, Perlez and Zemun.

== Interpretation ==
In the Kurgan hypothesis espoused by Marija Gimbutas, the Baden culture is seen as being Indo-Europeanized. However, according to Grandpierre K. Endre, it is possible that kurgan burials developed in parallel in the Carpathian Basin, before the arrival of the Indo-Europeans.

== Gallery ==
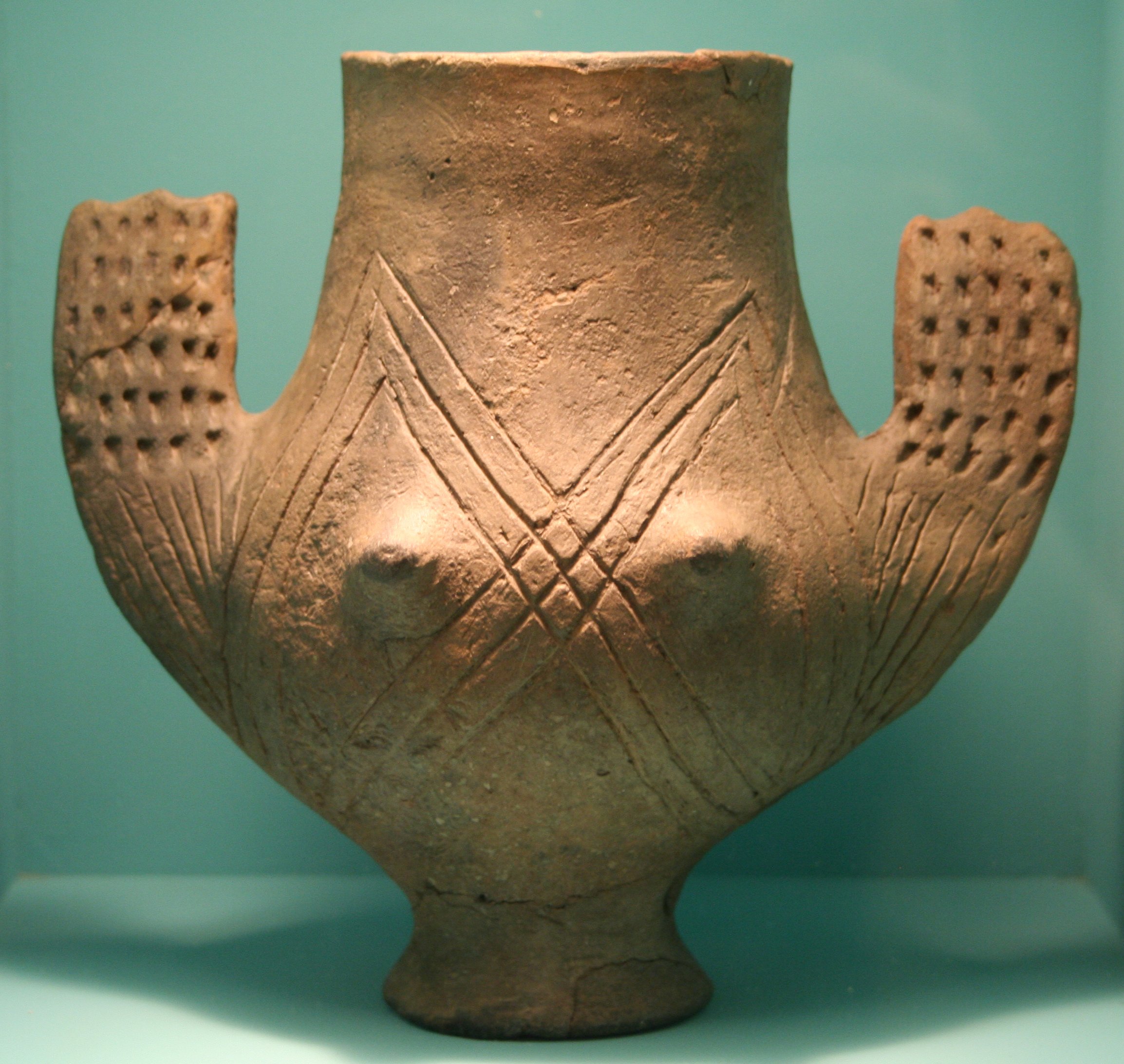
Baden culture ceramic vessel.

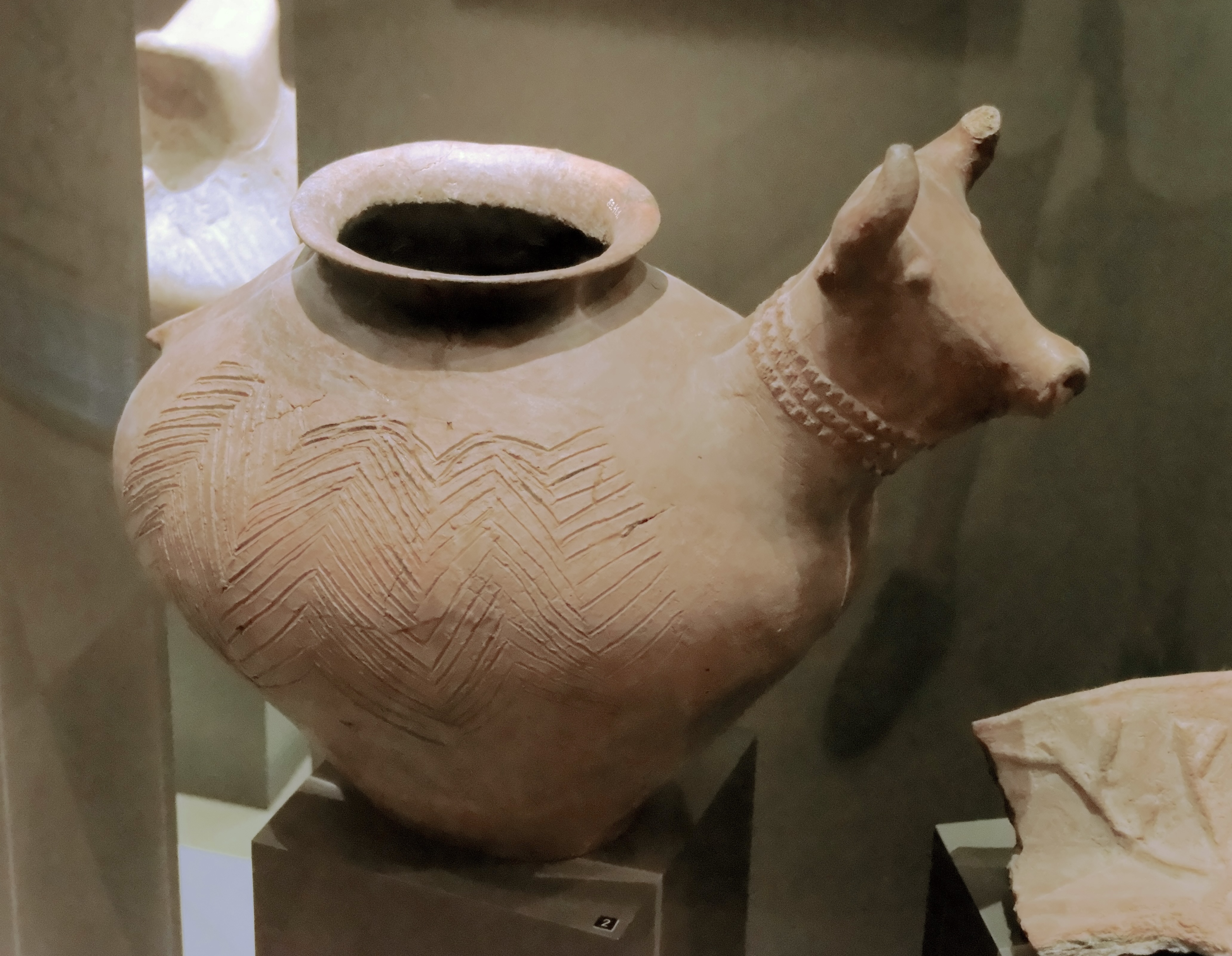
Zoomorphic vessel from Vác, Hungary

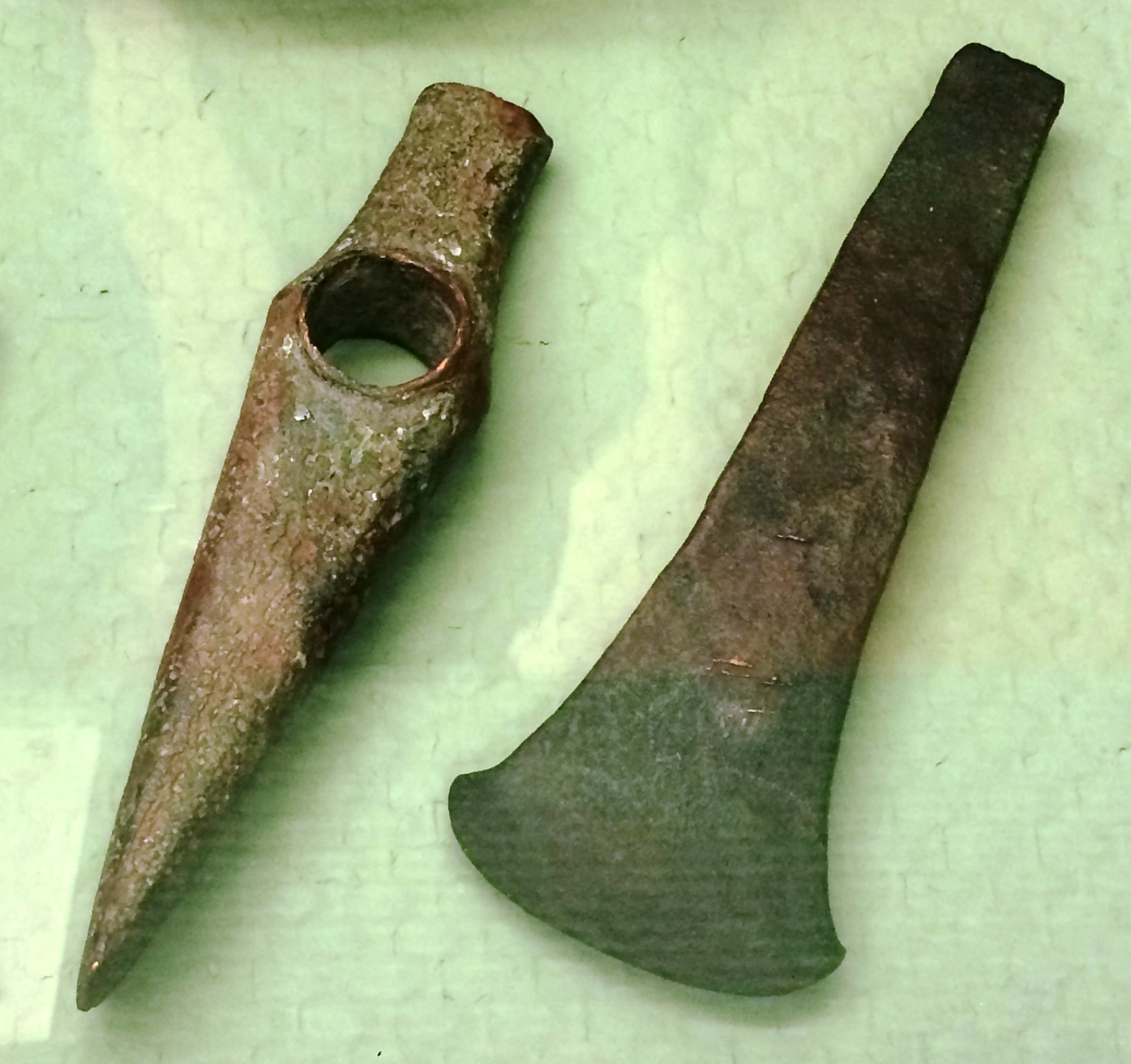
Metal axes, Hungary

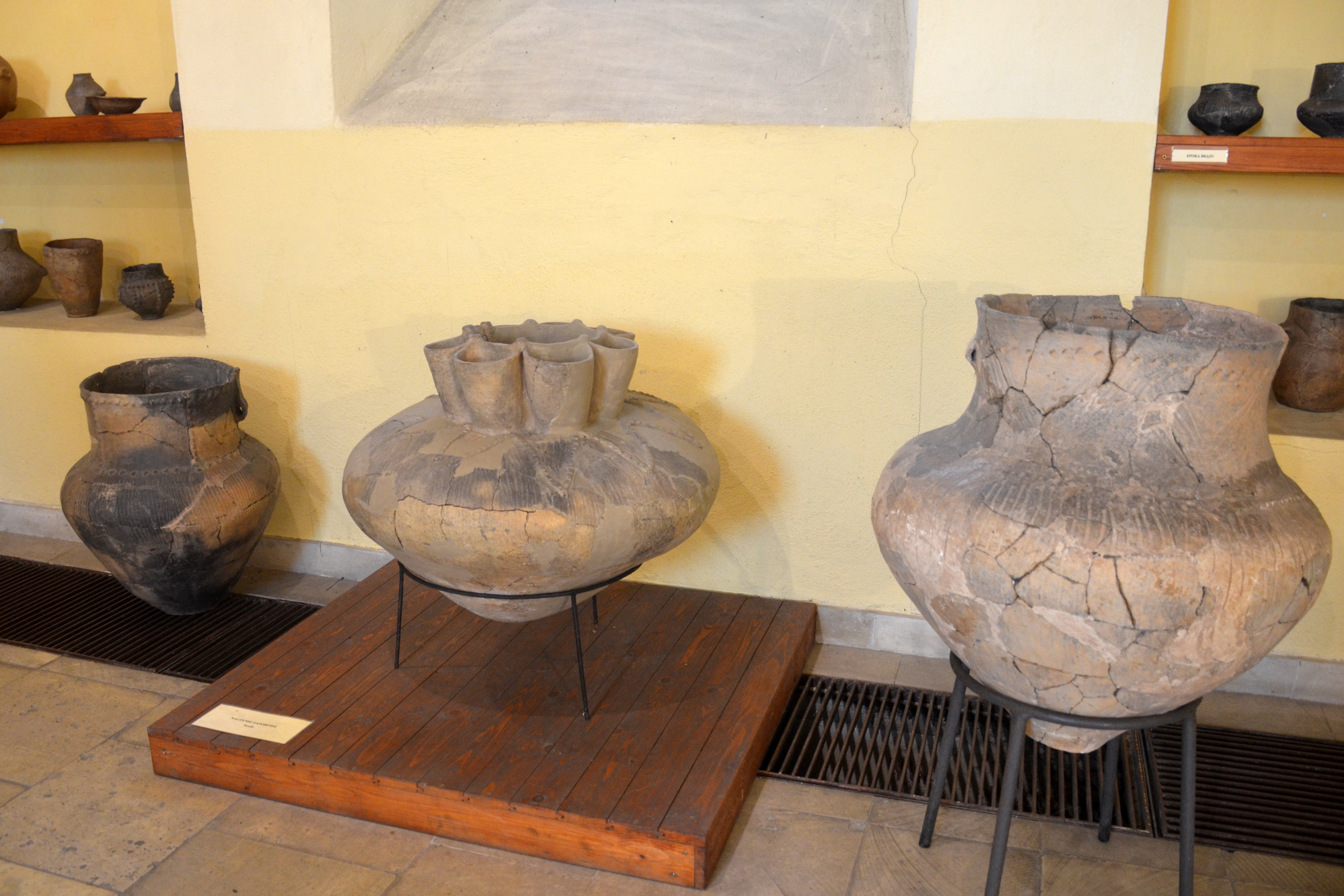
Large pottery, Poland

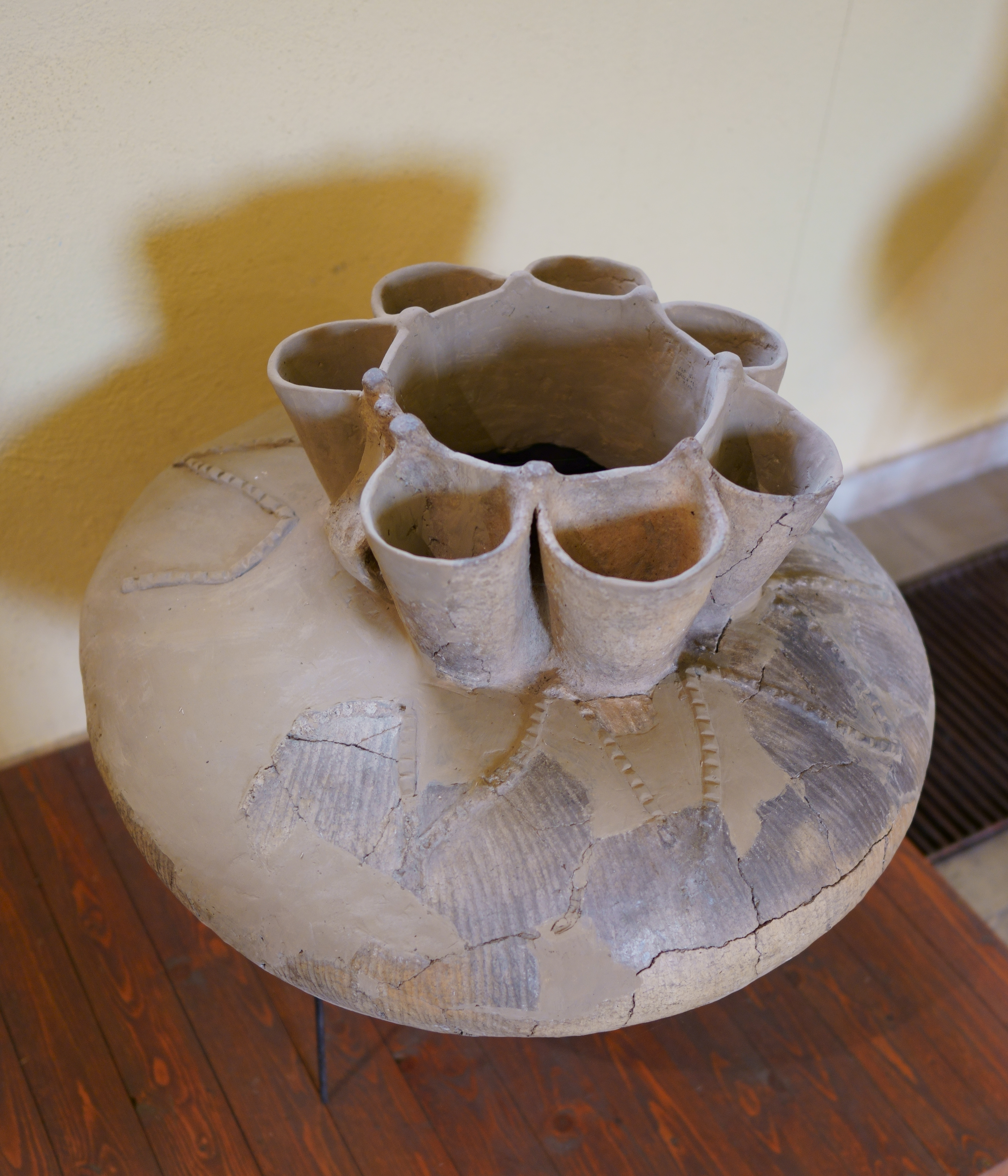
Large pottery, Poland

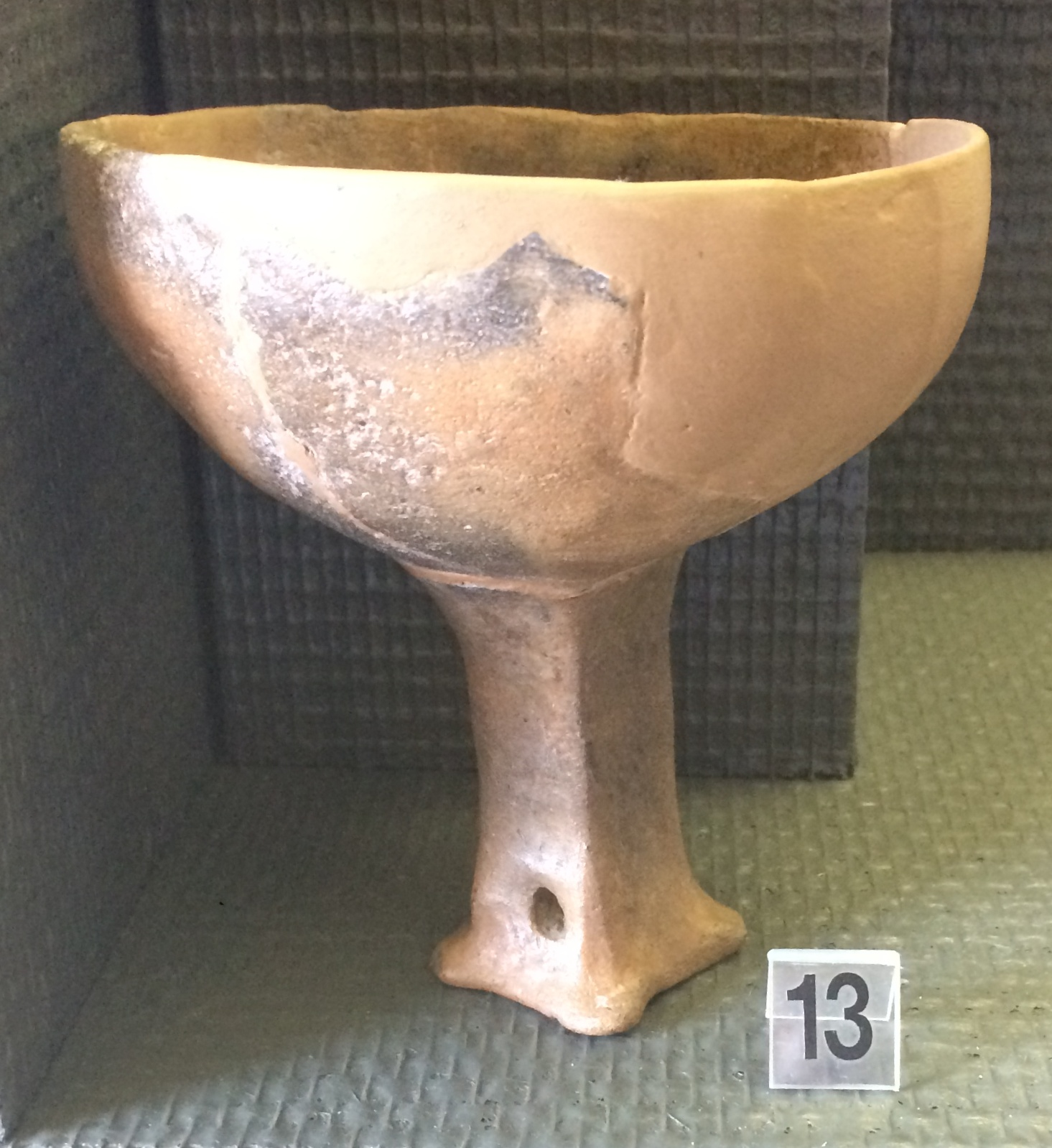
Pedestal bowl, Hungary

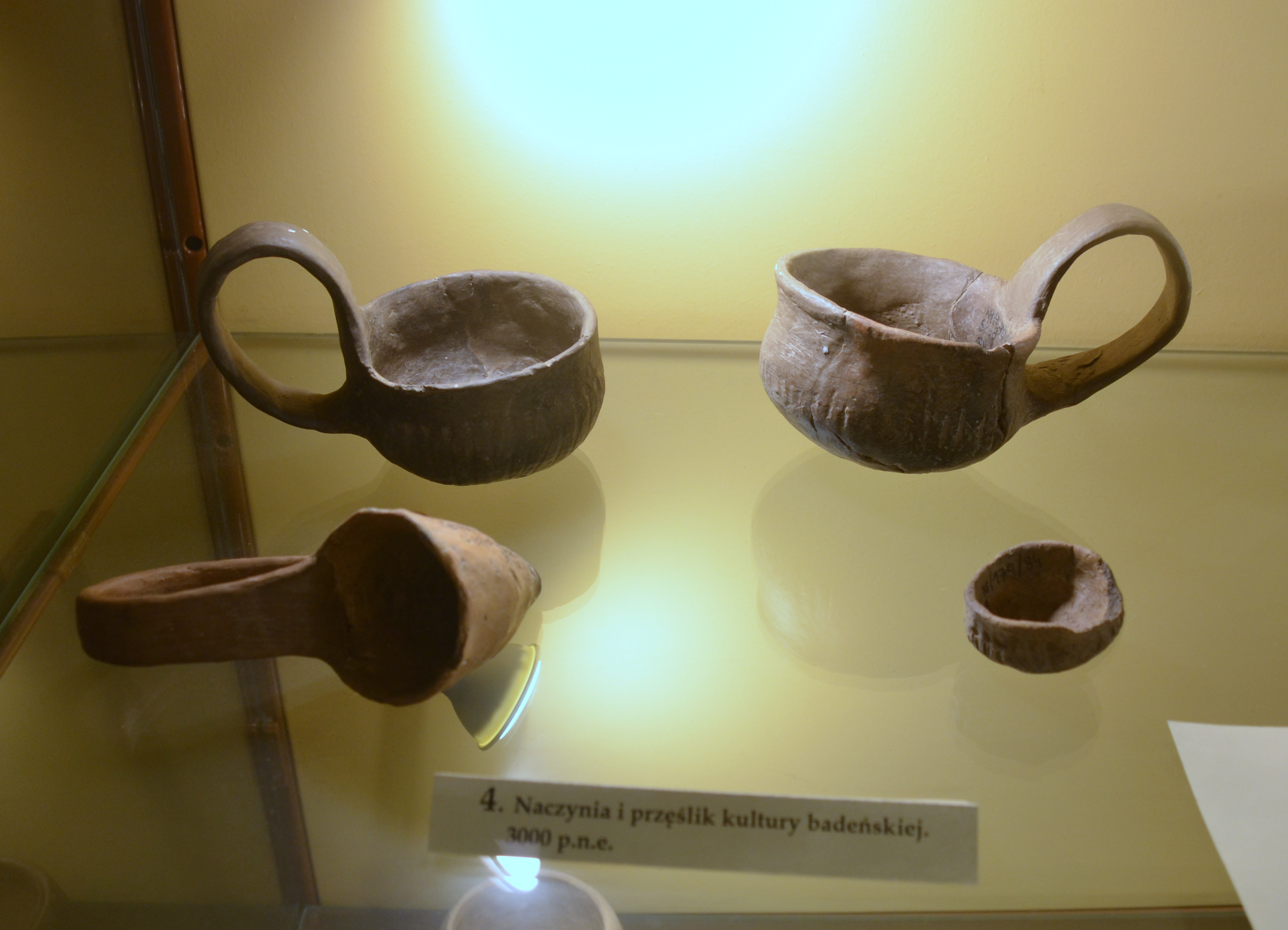
Ceramic cups, Poland

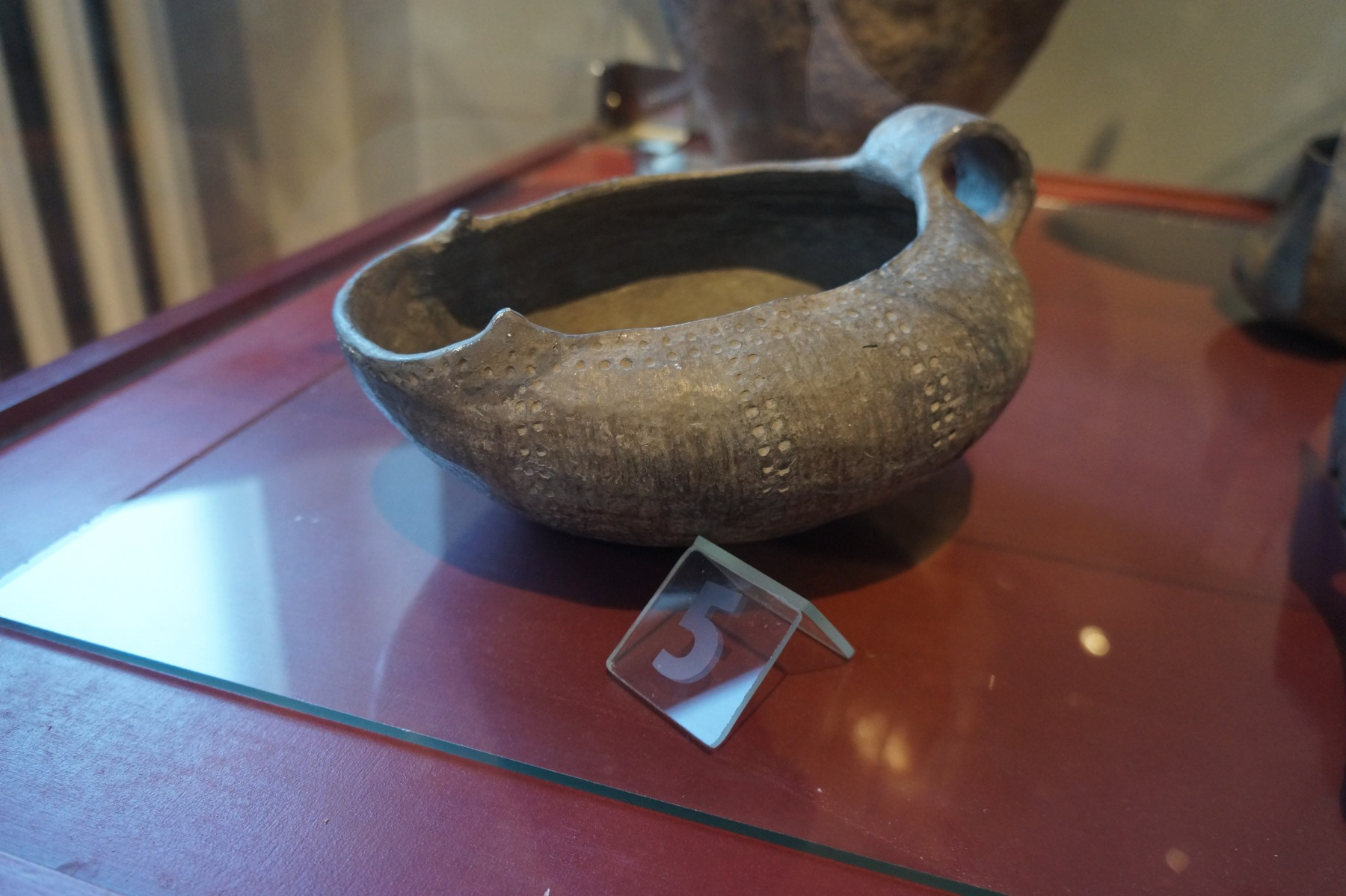
Ceramic dish, Serbia

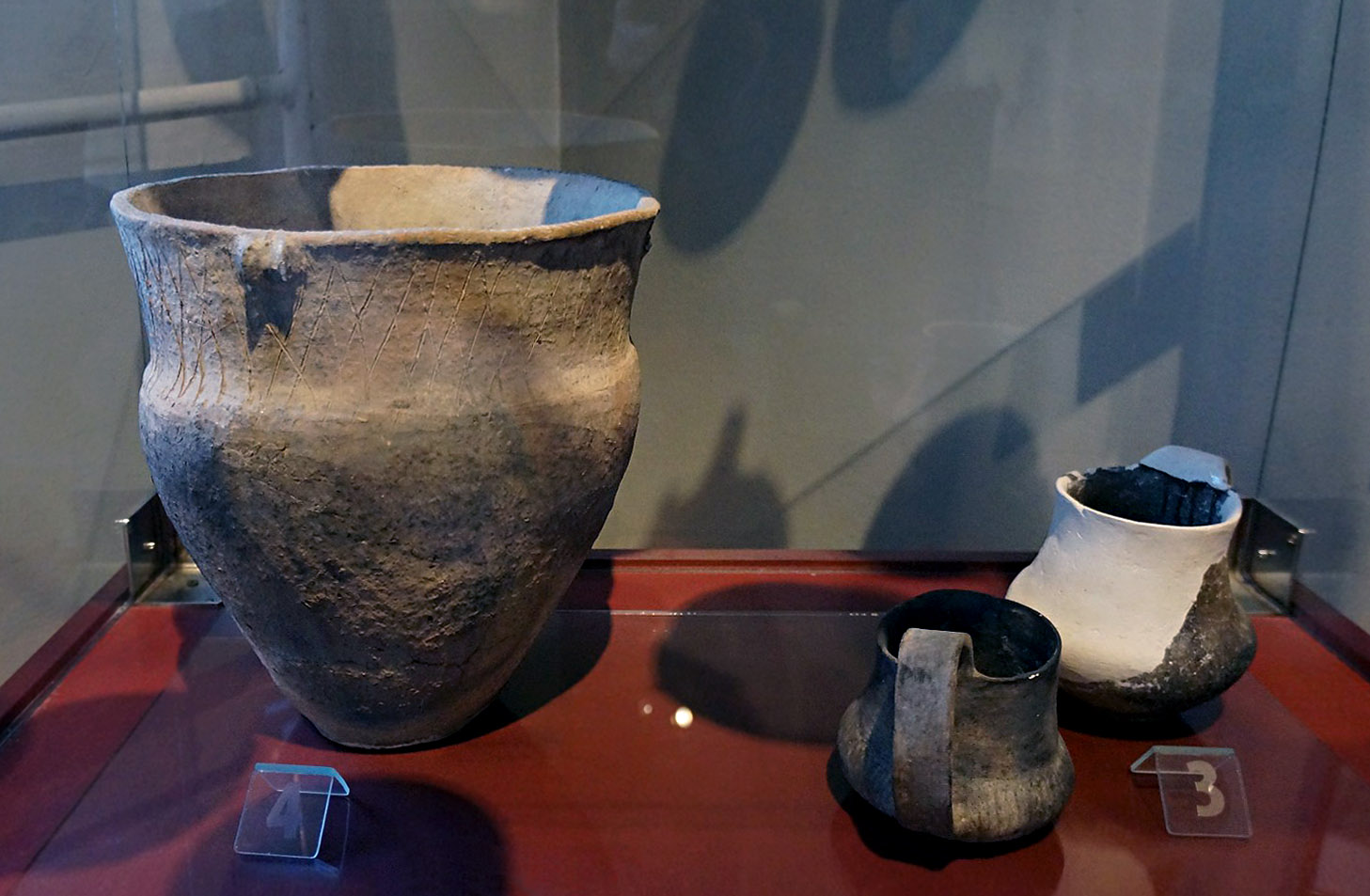
Ceramics, Serbia

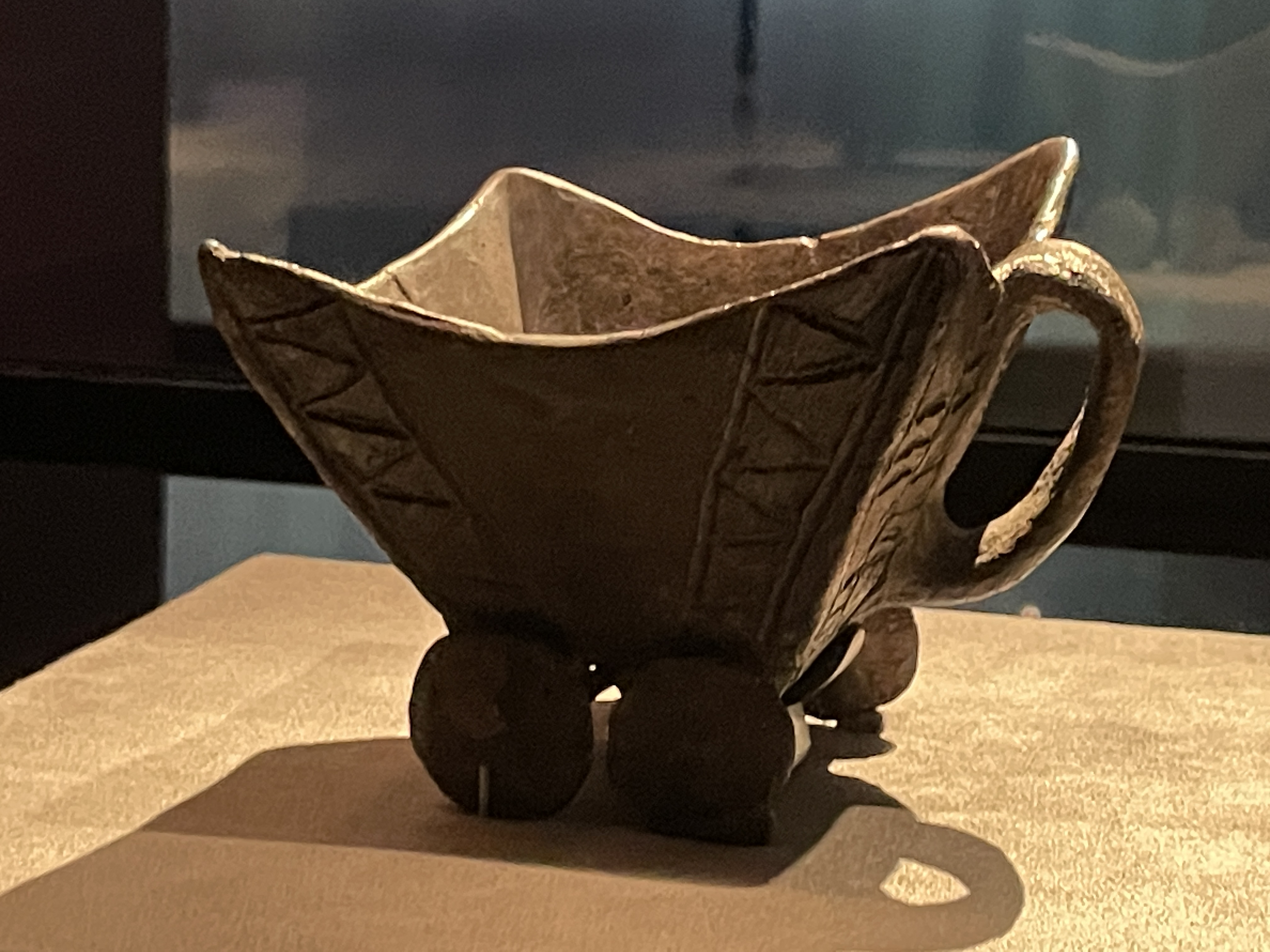
Ceramic wagon model, 3500-3000 BC, Hungary

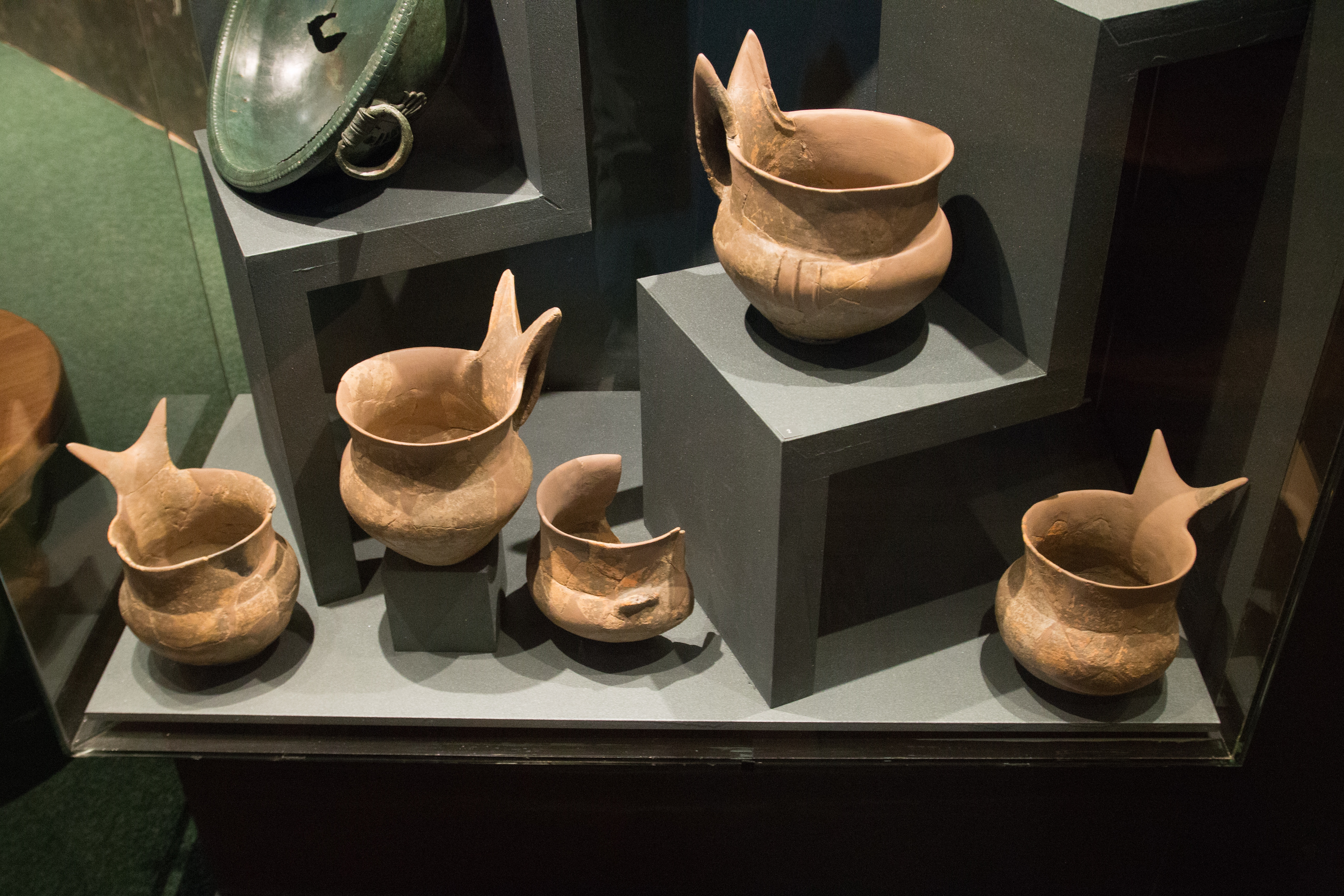
Ceramic cups, Czech Republic

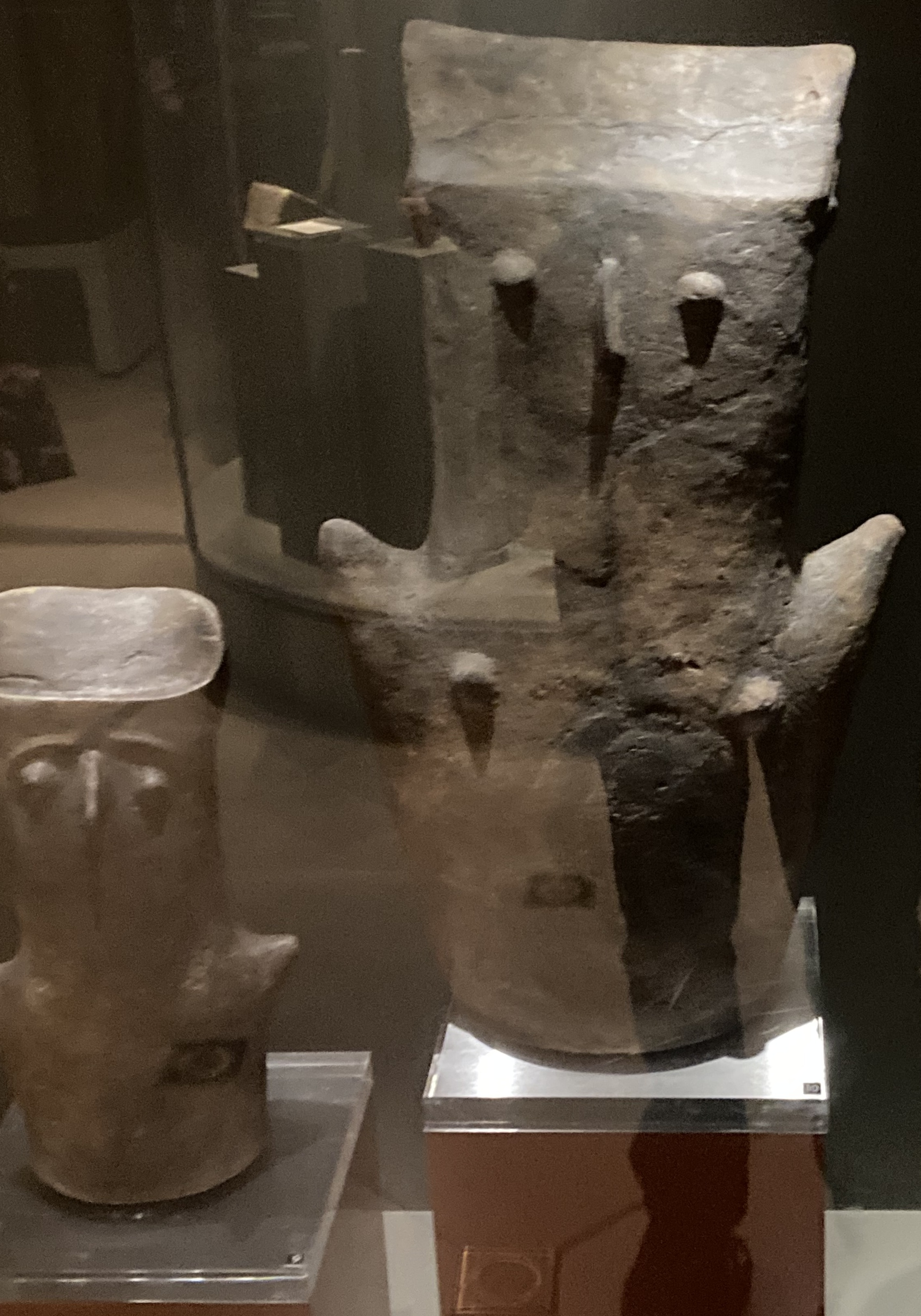
Anthropomorphic ceramic vessels

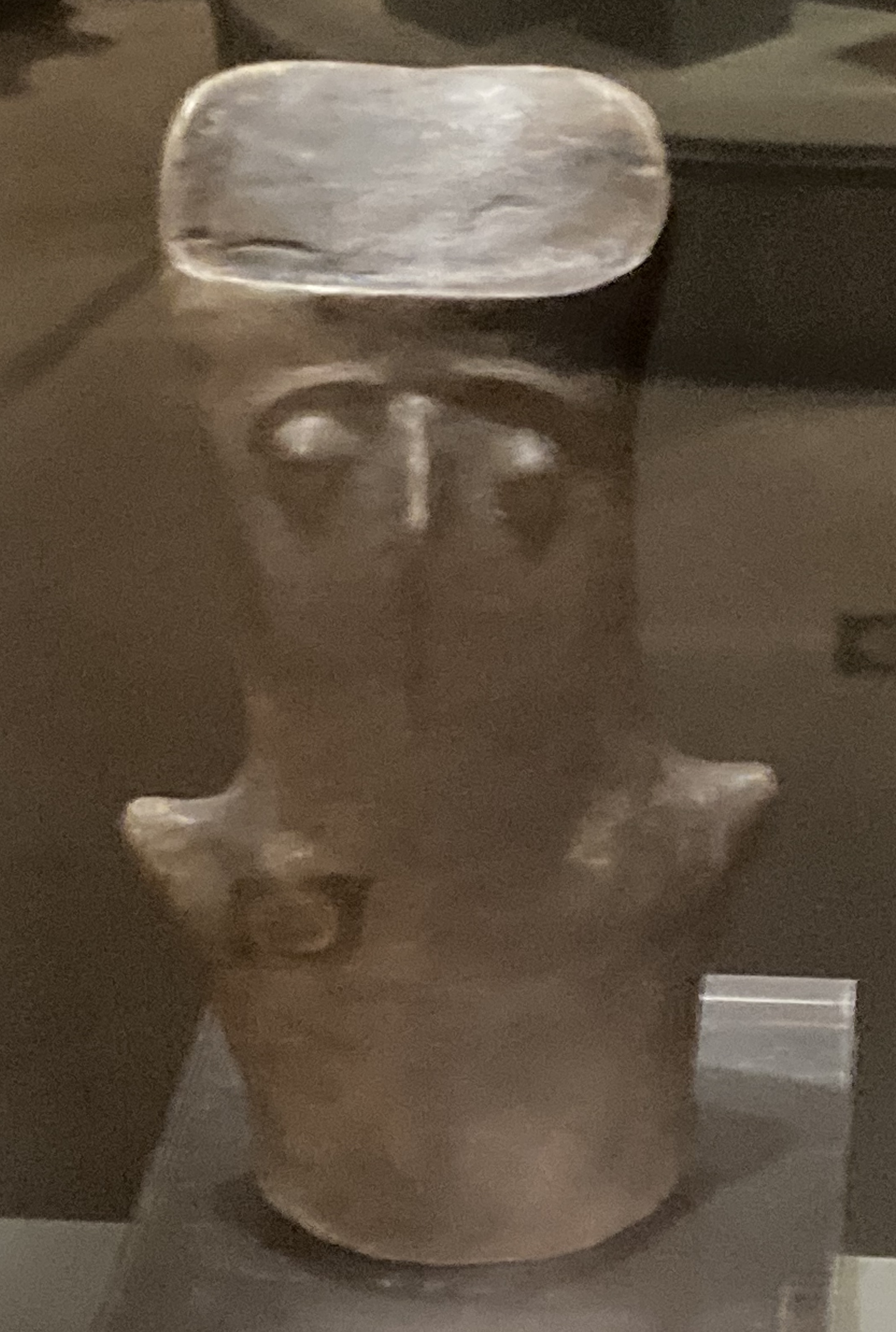
Anthropomorphic ceramic vessel

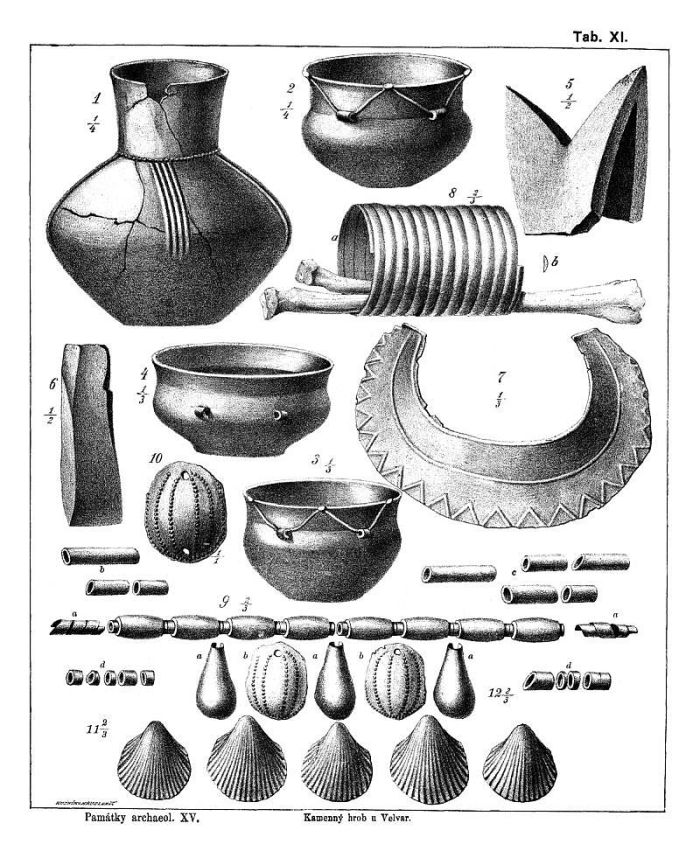
Various artefacts

== Genetics ==
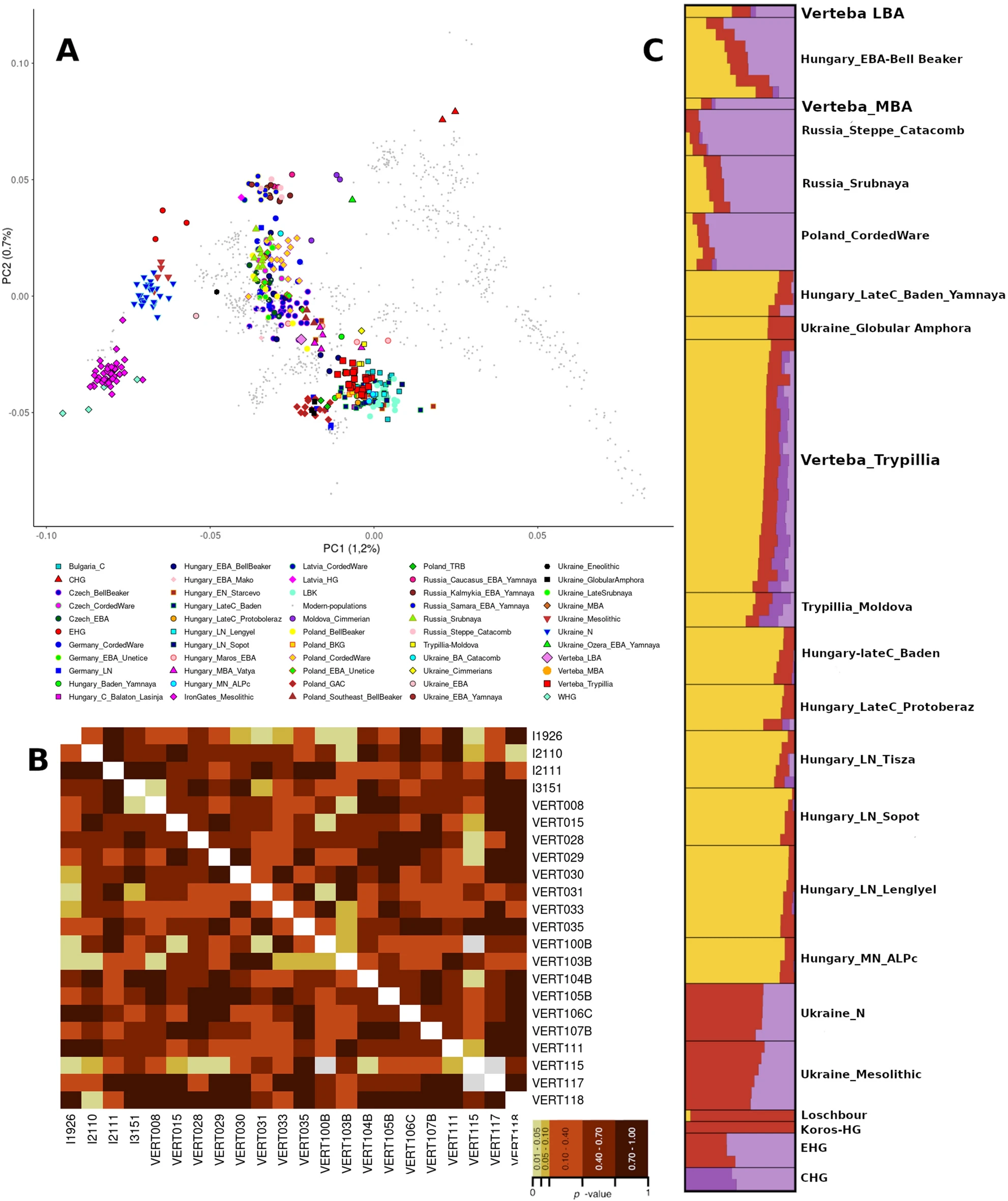
PCA and ADMIXTURE analysis showing that Baden individuals predominantly belong to European Neolithic populations of Anatolian ancestry, per Gelabert et al. 2022.

In three genetic studies the remains of fifteen individuals roughly from 3600 to 2850 BCE ascribed to the Baden culture were analyzed. Of the nine (plus one Proto-Boleraz) samples of Y-DNA, five belonged to various subclades of haplogroup G2a2 (G2a2b2a1a1c-CTS342, G2a2a2b-Z36525, G2a2b2a1a1b-L497, G2a2a1a2a1a-L166, G2a2b2a1a-PF3346), and four belonged to haplogroup I2 subclades (3x I2a1a1a1-Y11222, I2-P37). The mtDNA extracted included subclades of U5a1, U5b, U8b1a1, J1c, J1c2, J2a1a1, H, H26a, T2, T2b, T2c1d1, HV, K1a and W, summing up the earlier ones, in particular.

According to ADMIXTURE analysis they had approximately 78-91% Early European Farmers, 6-17% Western Hunter-Gatherer and 0-8% Western Steppe Herders-related ancestry, implying that the Indo-European influence on the local population was predominantly cultural and not biological.

== See also ==
- Prehistoric Europe
- Ezero culture
- Coțofeni culture
- Prehistory of Transylvania
- Vučedol culture

== Sources ==
- J. Banner, "Die Peceler Kultur. Arch. Hungarica 35, 1956.
- Vera Němejcová-Pavuková 1984. "K problematike trvania a konca boleazkej skupiny na Slovensku". Slovenska Arch. 34, 1986, 133–176.
- J. P. Mallory, "Baden Culture", Encyclopedia of Indo-European Culture, (Fitzroy Dearborn), 1997.
- Lipson, Mark (November 16, 2017). "Parallel palaeogenomic transects reveal complex genetic history of early European farmers". Nature. 551 (7680). Nature Research: 368–372. Bibcode:2017Natur.551..368L. doi:10.1038/nature24476. PMC 5973800. PMID 29144465.
- Narasimhan, Vagheesh M. (September 6, 2019). "The formation of human populations in South and Central Asia". Science. 365 (6457) eaat7487. American Association for the Advancement of Science. bioRxiv 10.1101/292581. doi:10.1126/science.aat7487. PMC 6822619. PMID 31488661.
- Patterson, Nick; et al. (2022). "Large-scale migration into Britain during the Middle to Late Bronze Age" (PDF). Nature. 601 (7894): 588–594. Bibcode:2022Natur.601..588P. doi:10.1038/s41586-021-04287-4. PMC 8889665. PMID 34937049. S2CID 245509501.
