= Usatove culture =

Archaeological culture

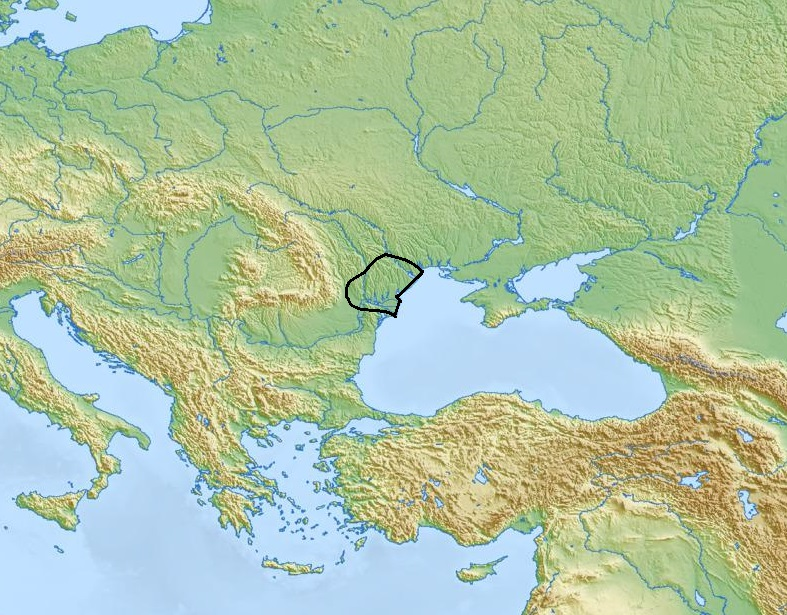
- Geographical range: Northwest Black Sea: eastern Romania, Moldova and southern Ukraine
- Period: Copper Age, Bronze Age
- Dates: ca. 3650–2740 BCE
- Preceded by: Mikhaylovka culture, Kemi-Oba culture, Cucuteni–Trypillia culture, Cernavodă culture
- Followed by: Yamnaya culture, Ezero culture, Coţofeni culture, Baden culture, possibly Troad, Aegean civilisation (?)

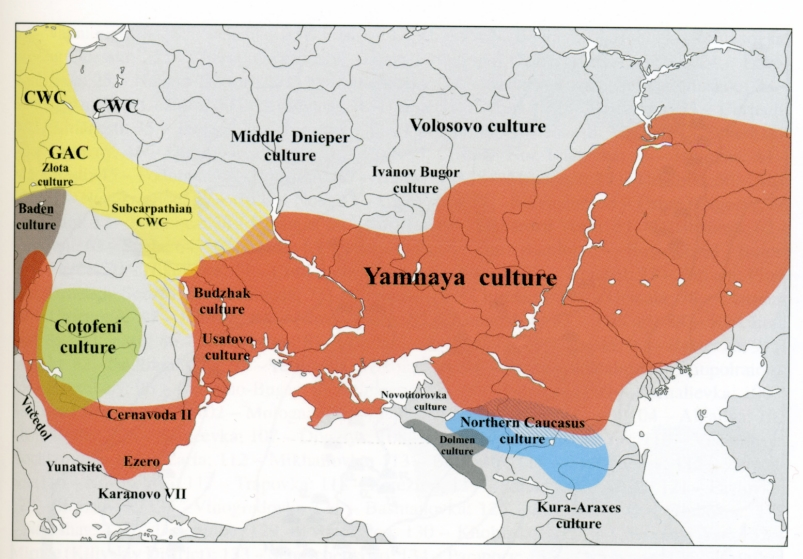
Map

The Usatove culture (Usatove in Ukrainian, Usatovo in Russian) is an Eneolithic group of the northwest and west Pontic region (ca. 3650-2740 BCE), with influences from the Cucuteni–Trypillia culture as well as the Eneolithic steppe cultures of the North Pontic. Usatove culture flourished west and northwest of the Black Sea in eastern Romania, Moldova and southern Ukraine, in more than 50 sites. The culture got its name from the village of Usatove in the Odesa Oblast of Ukraine.

The Usatove culture appears to be a mixture of the Eneolithic agrarian cultures of Southeast Europe, with influences from the steppe cultures from the Pontic–Caspian steppe. The Eneolithic farming culture influences on Usatove include clay figurines and painted ceramics, while it shares tumulus (kurgan) burials and shell-tempered coarse wares with steppe cultures. It also displays items made of metal, such as arsenical bronze and silver, which suggests contacts with the North Caucasus as well as Anatolia.

In Ukraine, Usatove culture sites are predominantly located in the Dniester-Danube interfluve. The two largest Usatove archaeological sites in Ukraine, Usatove-Velykyj Kuyalnik and Mayaky, contain kurgan and ground cemeteries (necropoli).

Within the Kurgan hypothesis, the Usatove culture represents the domination of native Cucuteni–Trypillia agriculturalists by Indo-European peoples from the steppe. According to Anthony, the roots of the pre-Germanic languages lay in the Usatove culture.

While the generally accepted chronological placement of Usatove is in the second half of the 4th millennium BCE, radiocarbon dates on human remains identified as Usatove are consistently older. Most of these dates cluster around the last quarter of the 5th - first quarter of the 4th millennium BCE. It is likely that the dates on human remains are influenced by aquatic reservoir effect, the precise quantification of which is not possible at the moment due to the lack of radiocarbon and stable isotope data from contextual faunal remains.

== Chronology ==
Radiocarbon dates on pottery are between 3400 and 2900 BCE, around 600 years later than analyses in human bones, which indicate Usatove culture would have lasted (c. 4000-3500 BCE).

== Gallery ==
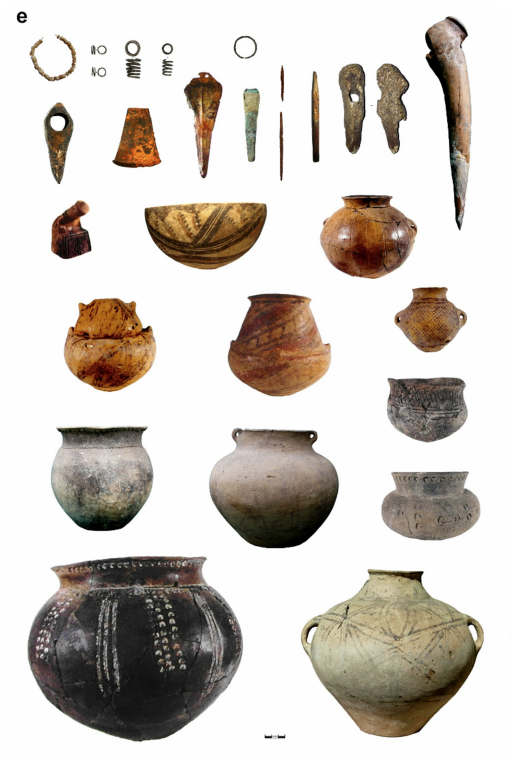
Metal, bone and ceramic artefacts

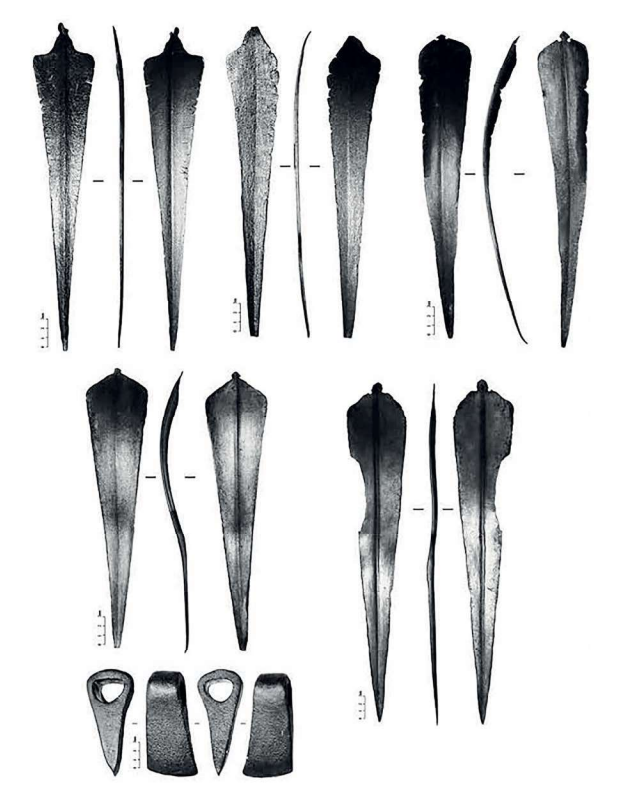
Arsenical bronze swords and copper axe, Ukraine

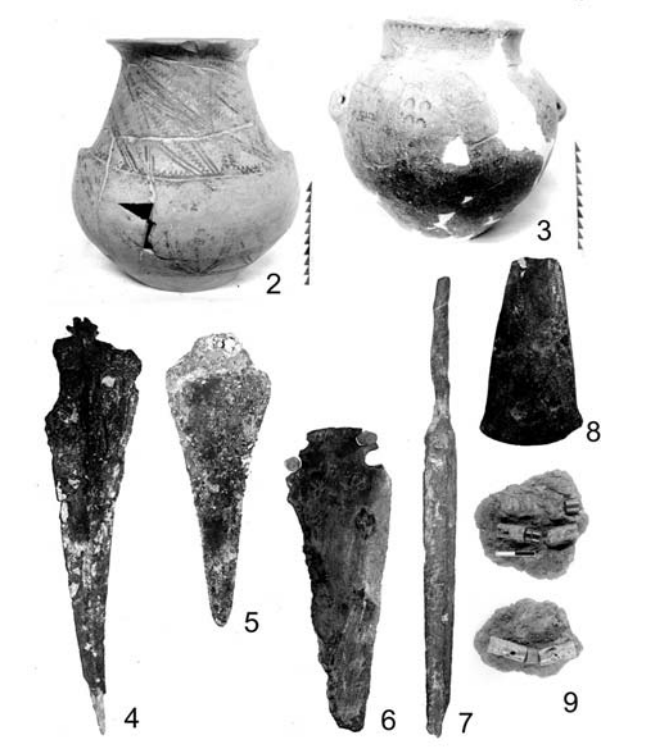
Ceramic and metal artefacts

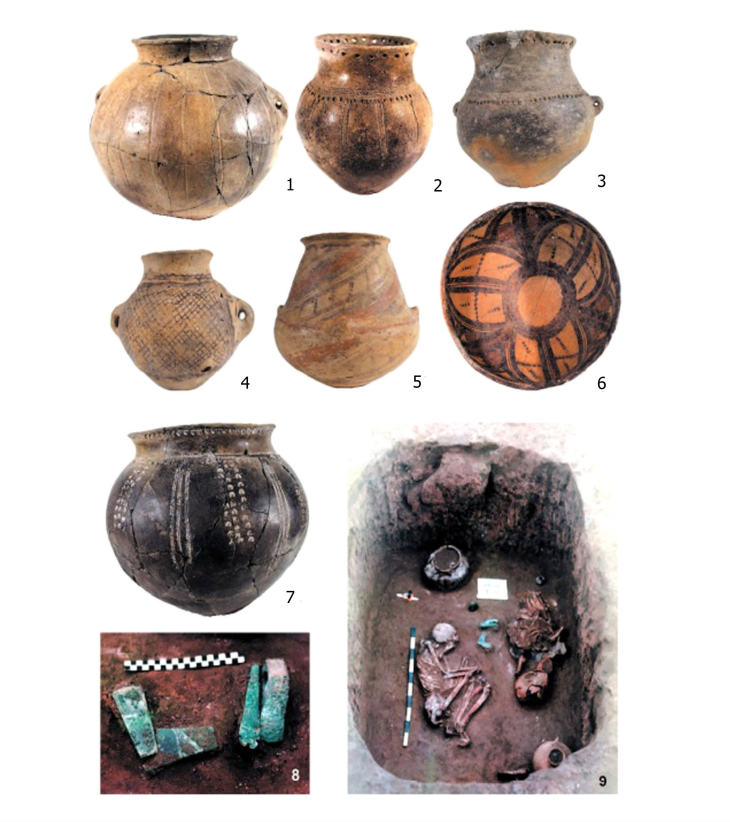
Ceramic vessels, metal tools and burial

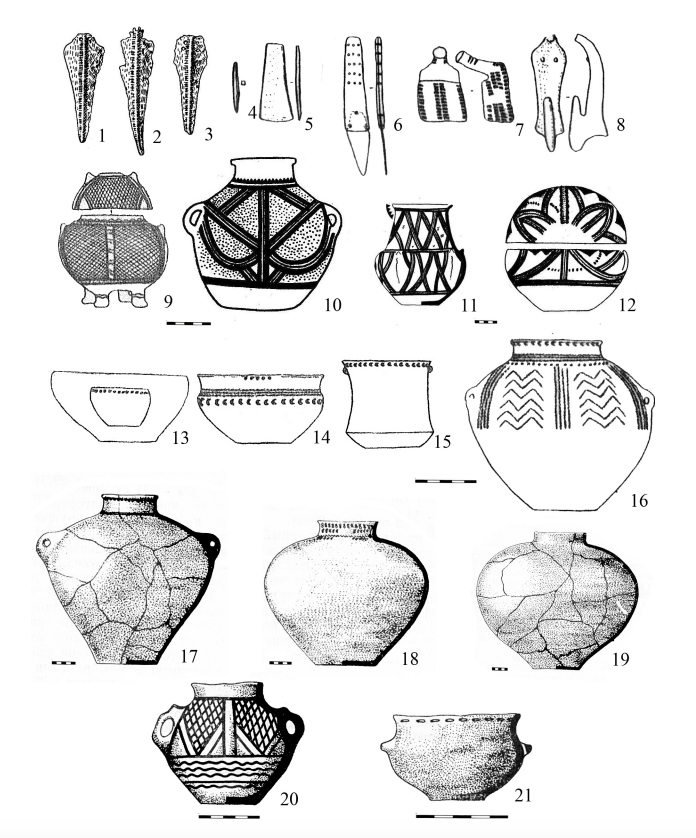
Metal, bone and ceramic artefacts

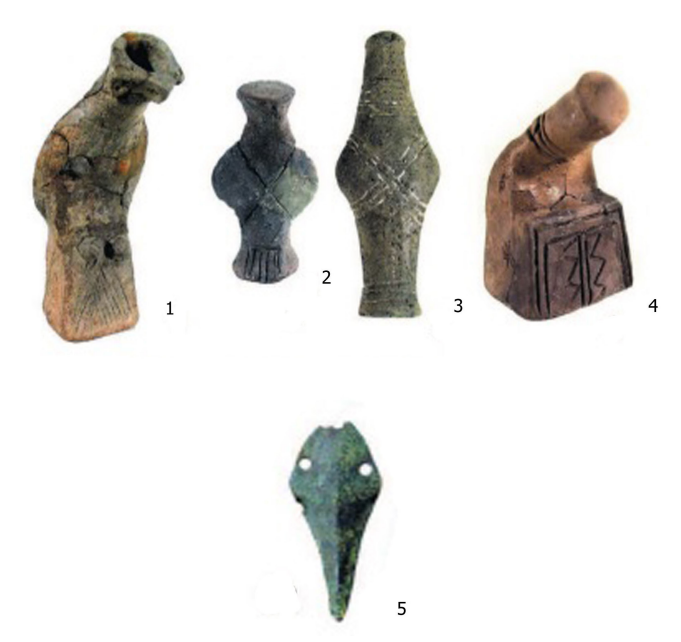
Ceramic figurines and metal dagger

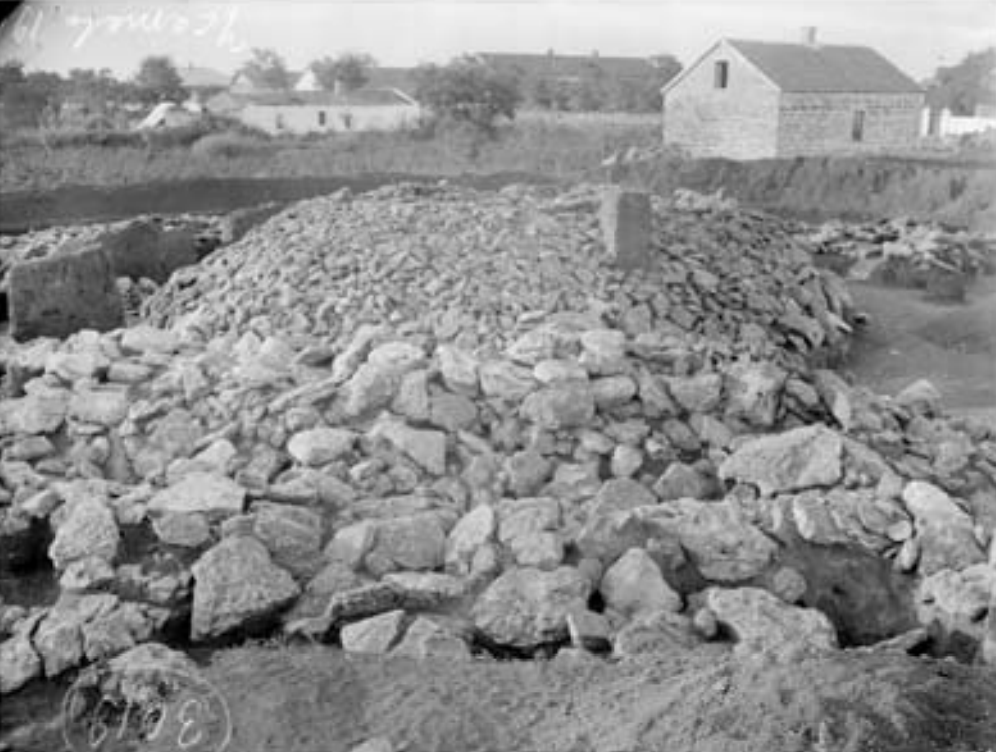
Burial mounds with stone constructions

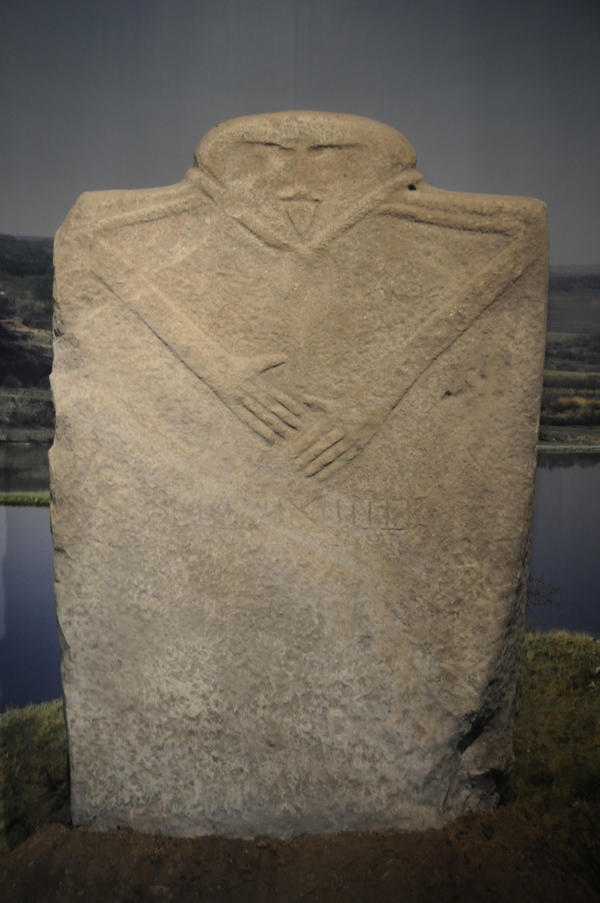
Nevsha stele, c. 3000 BC

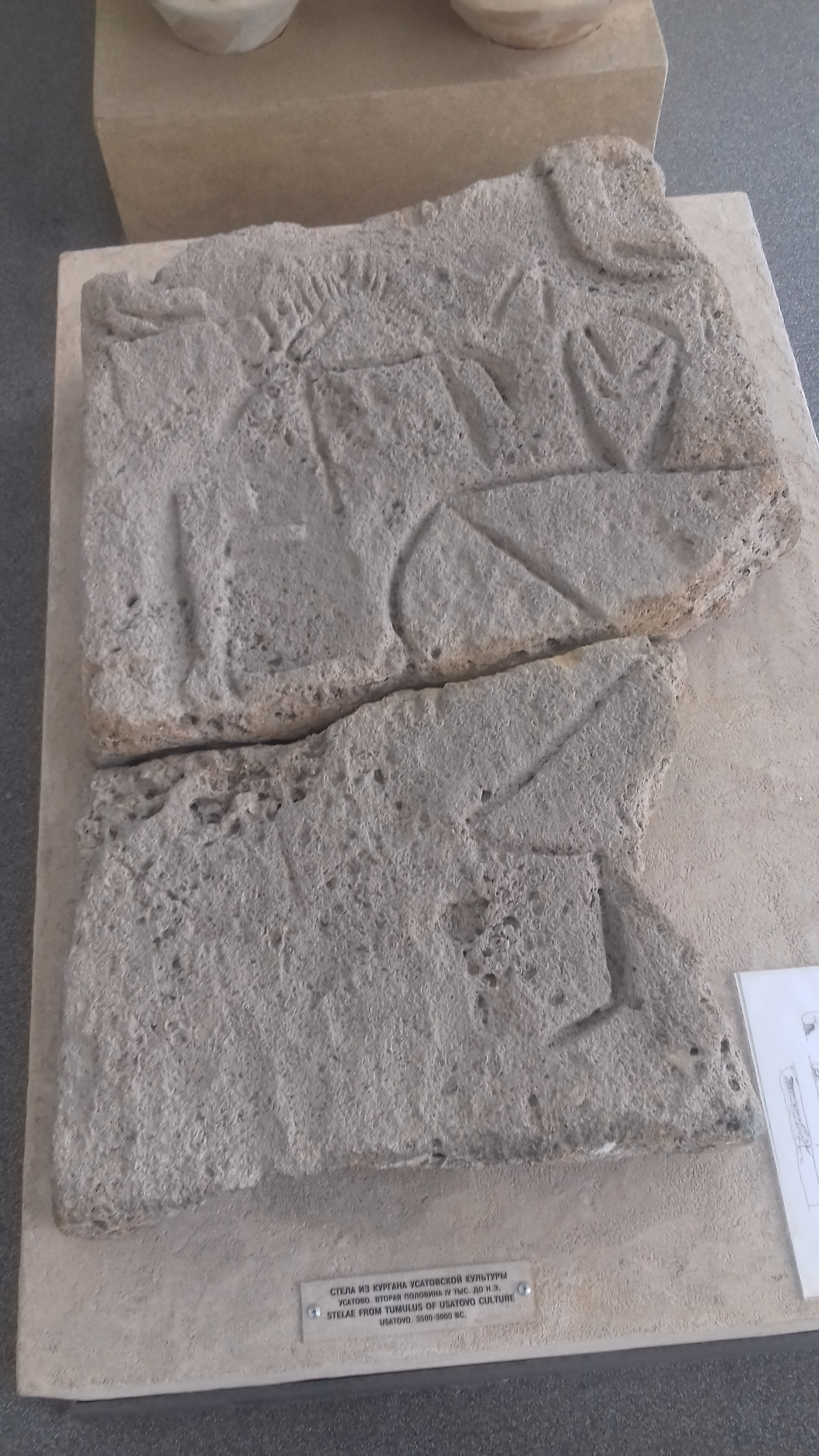
Stele, 3500-3000 BC

== Long distance trade ==
A number of Usatove artifacts come from rather remote territories, most likely testifying in favor of a multi-stage exchange. In the kurgan near the village of Sadove, on the western bank of the Dniester Estuary, beads made of white faience, jet, Mediterranean horn corals (gorgonians) and an amulet pendant made of typical Egyptian "alabaster" were identified. Bone labrysoid beads from the same burial mound come from the area of the post-Mariupol culture. It is difficult to judge where the bead of red amber known in Usatove came from. Glass beads found in the second burial mound of the Usatove-Velykyi Kuialnyk archaeological complex (along with finds in the Sofievsky burial mound near Kyiv and beads from a hoard near the village of Ketroshika in Moldova, in the Middle Dniester region) are the oldest glass known in the Old World. They were likely made in the Circum-Pontic area (indicated by the presence of arsenic in the glass). These are believed to be of local origin - as a product associated with bronze metallurgy, and imported - from Anatolia or South Transcaucasia.

== Genetics ==
=== Haplogroups ===
According to genetic studies, males of the Usatove culture carried such Y haplogroups as E1b1b1a1, J1 (J-FT265222), R1a, and R1b1a2a2. Mitochondrial DNA lineages of Usatove are represented by H5, I5, U4, U4b1b2, U4d3, U5a1a1, U5a1f1, T2h2, W1, X2, and X2d.

=== Whole genome analysis ===
Recent studies indicate that Usatove ancestry consists of equal parts of the ancestry of the Lower Volga-Caucasus (CLV, PVgroup) and Trypillia.

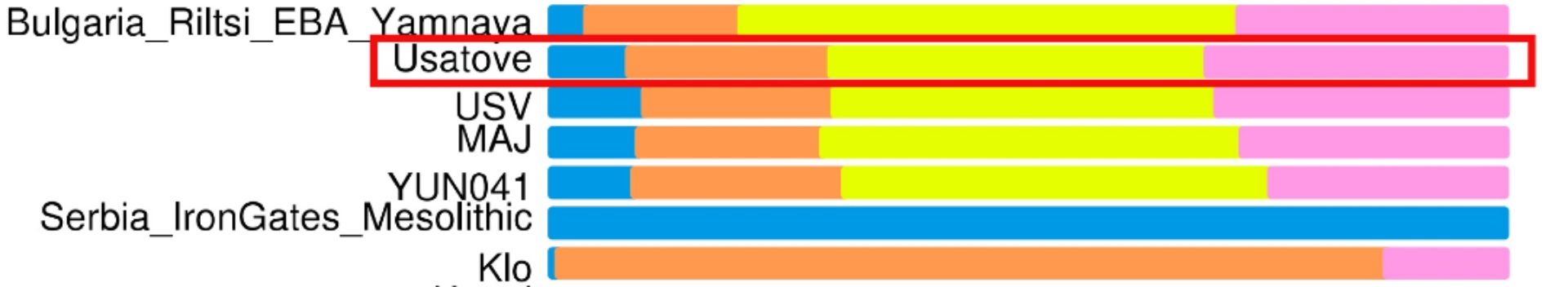

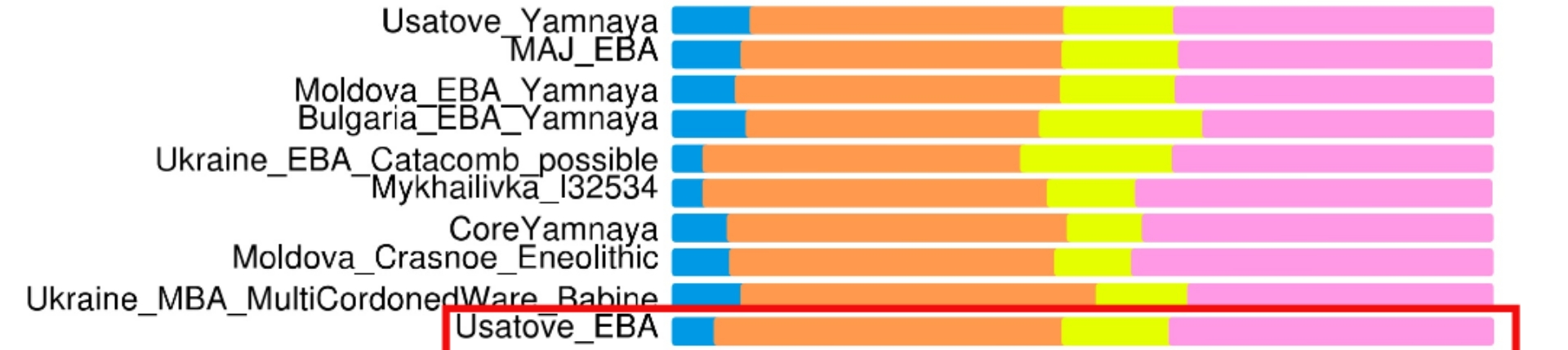
Genetics of culture Usatovo. Eastern Hunter Gatherer ( EHG), Caucasian Hunter-Gatherer ( CHG), Anatolian Neolithic ( ) and Western Hunter Gatherer ( WHG)

== See also ==
- Suvorovo culture
- Novodanilovka group

== Sources ==
- Anthony, David W. (2007). The Horse, the Wheel, and Language: How Bronze-Age Riders from the Eurasian Steppes Shaped the Modern World. Princeton University Press. ISBN 978-0-691-14818-2.
- Mallory, J. P.; Adams, Douglas Q. (1997). "Ustatovo culture". Encyclopedia of Indo-European Culture. Taylor & Francis. p. 614. ISBN 1884964982.
- Manzura, Igor'; Petrenko, Vladislav (2022). Cemetery II of Usatovsky (based on 1984 excavations). Tyragetia, s.n., vol. XVI [XXXI], nr. 1, 2022, pp. 83-101, (in Russian).
- Mattila, Tiina; et al. (9 August 2023). "Genetic continuity, isolation, and gene flow in Stone Age Central and Eastern Europe". Communications Biology. 6 (1): 793. doi:10.1038/s42003-023-05131-3. PMC 10412644. PMID 37558731.
- Nikitin, Alexey G.; et al. (3 October 2022). "New Radiocarbon Dating and Stable Isotope Analysis of Human Remains from the Usatovo Culture Site of Mayaki in Ukraine". SSRN 4236123.
- Nikitin, Alexey G. (30 December 2022). "The Origins and Chronology of the Usatove Culture". Archaeologia Lituana. 23: 148–156. doi:10.15388/ArchLit.2022.23.9.
- Nikitin, Alexey; Ivanova, Svetlana (2025). "A genomic history of the North Pontic Region from the Neolithic to the Bronze Age". Nature. 639 (8053): 124–131. Bibcode:2025Natur.639..124N. bioRxiv 10.1101/2024.04.17.589600. doi:10.1038/s41586-024-08372-2. PMC 11909631. PMID 39910299.
- Patokova, E.F. (1979) Усатовское поселение и могильники. Киев: Наукова Думка.
- Petrenko, VG; Káiser, E. (2011). Комплексный памятник Маяки: новые изотопные даты и некоторые вопросы хронологии наличных культур. Материалы по археологии Северного Причерноморья 12, 31-61.
