= Gumelnița–Kodžadermen-Karanovo VI complex =

Neolithic culture

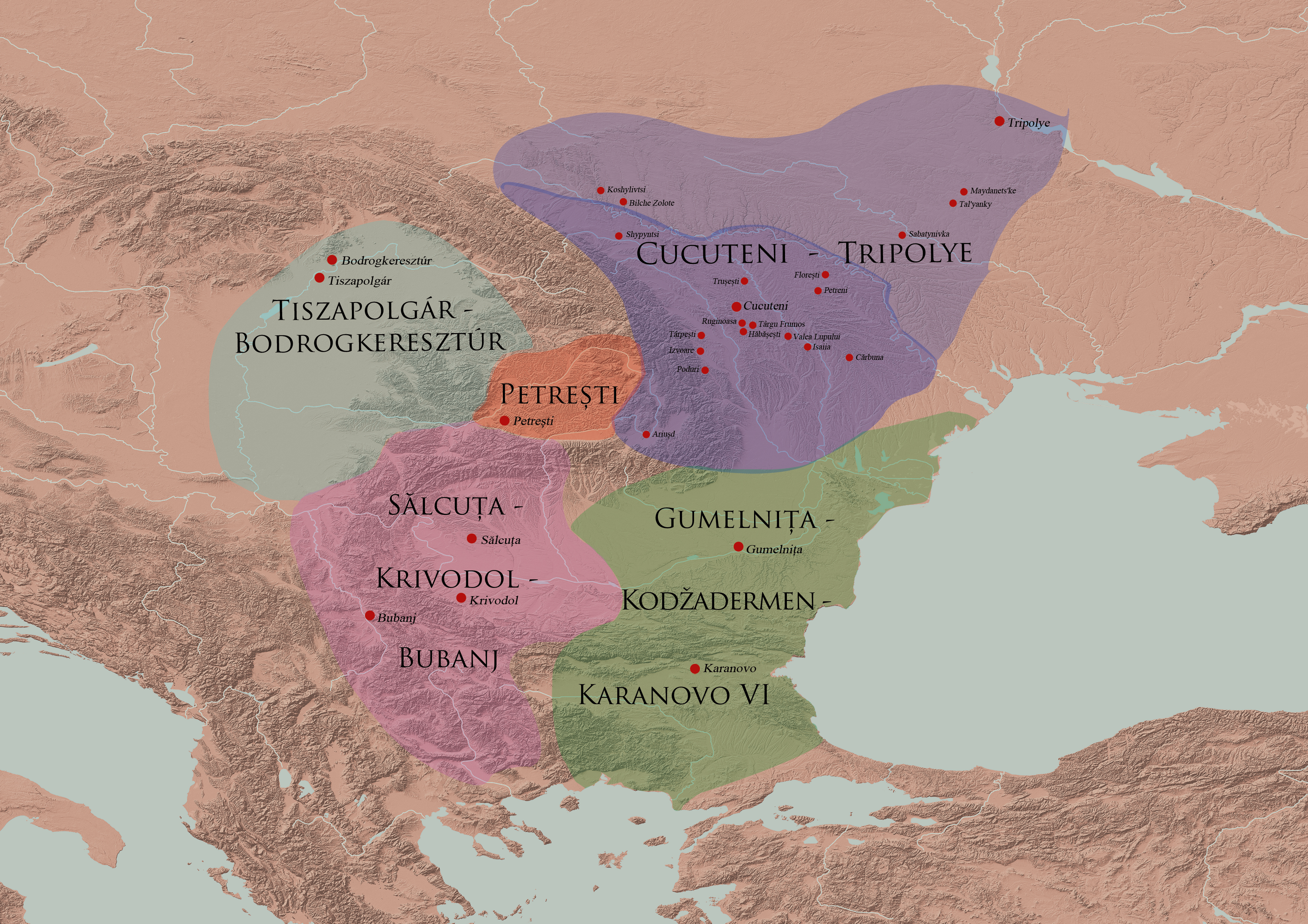
- Horizon: Old Europe
- Period: Chalcolithic
- Dates: c. 4500 BC – c. 4000 BC
- Preceded by: Karanovo V, Hamangia culture, Boian culture
- Followed by: Cernavodă culture, Karanovo VII

The Gumelnița–Kodžadermen-Karanovo VI complex was a Chalcolithic cultural complex of the fifth millennium BC located in the eastern Balkans, comprising the Gumelnița, Kodžadermen and Karanovo cultures. It is also aggregated with the Varna culture. It formed part of the broader cultural complex known as Old Europe. Gumelnița–Kodžadermen-Karanovo VI evolved out of the earlier Boian culture and phase V of the Karanovo culture. From c. 4000 BC Gumelnița–Kodžadermen-Karanovo VI was replaced by the Cernavodă culture.

== Danube script ==
During the Middle Copper Age, the Danube script appears in three horizons: The Gumelnița–Kodžadermen-Karanovo VI cultural complex (mainly in Bulgaria, but also in Romania), the Cucuteni A3-A4–Trypillya B (in Ukraine), and Coțofeni I (in Serbia). The first, rates 68.6% of the frequencies; the second, rates 24.2%; and the third, rates 7.6%.

== See also ==
- Old Europe
- Vinča culture
- Tărtăria tablets
- Vinča symbols
- Sesklo culture
- Cucuteni–Trypillia culture
- Hamangia culture
- Butmir Culture
- Tisza culture
- Linear Pottery culture
- Lengyel culture
- Funnelbeaker culture

== Bibliography ==
- Stefan Hiller, Vassil Nikolov (eds.), Karanovo III. Beiträge zum Neolithikum in Südosteuropa Österreichisch-Bulgarische Ausgrabungen und Forschungen in Karanovo, Band III, Vienna (2000), ISBN 3-901232-19-2.
