= Ezero culture =

Archaeological culture

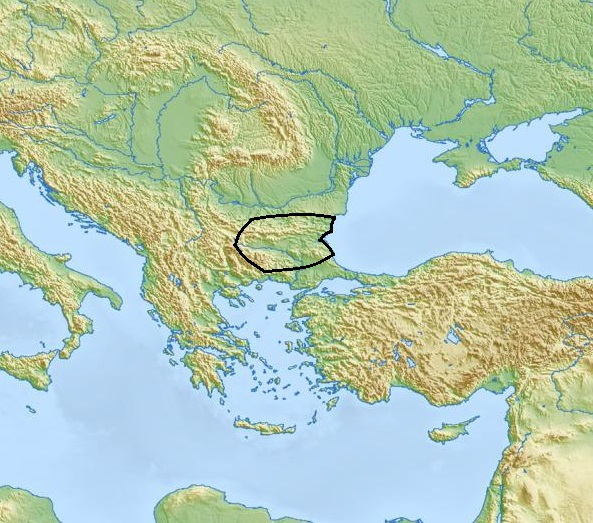
- Geographical range: Bulgaria
- Period: Bronze Age Europe
- Dates: c. 3300 – 2700 BC
- Preceded by: Suvorovo culture, Karanovo culture, Gumelniţa culture, Varna culture, Cernavodă culture
- Followed by: Myceneans, Trojans, Thracians

The Ezero culture, 3300—2700 BC, was a Bronze Age archaeological culture occupying most of present-day Bulgaria. It takes its name from the Tell-settlement of Ezero.

Ezero follows the copper age cultures of the area (Karanovo VI culture, Gumelniţa culture, Kodzadjemen culture, and Varna culture), after a settlement hiatus in Northern Bulgaria. It bears some relationship to the earlier Cernavodă III culture to the north. Some settlements were fortified.

The Ezero culture is interpreted as part of a larger Balkan-Danubian early Bronze Age complex, a horizon reaching from Troy Id-IIc into Central Europe, encompassing the Baden of the Carpathian Basin and the Coţofeni culture of Romania. According to Hermann Parzinger, there are also typological connections to Poliochne IIa-b and Sitagroi IV.

== Economy ==
Agriculture is in evidence, along with domestic livestock. There is evidence of grape cultivation. Metallurgy was practiced.

== Interpretation ==
Within the context of the Kurgan hypothesis, it would represent a fusion of native "Old European culture" and intrusive "Kurgan culture" elements.

== Genetics ==
=== Haplogroups ===
Genetic studies have shown that the Ezero culture had a male haplogroup R1b. Among the female haplogroups were J2a1, T, U5a1, T2d2, W.

=== Autosomal DNA ===
Genetically the Ezero culture was of local Neolithic origin mainly, also had a contribution from WSH, but this contribution was of varying degrees in the Ezero samples.

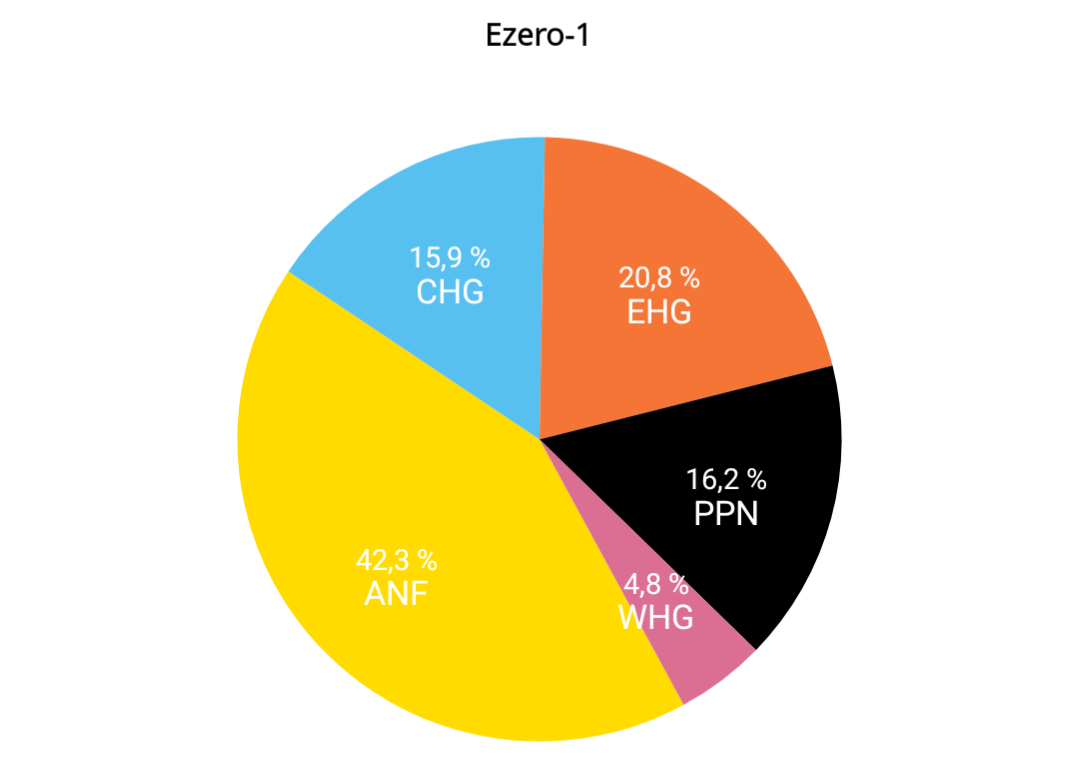
Autosomal DNA Ezero culture

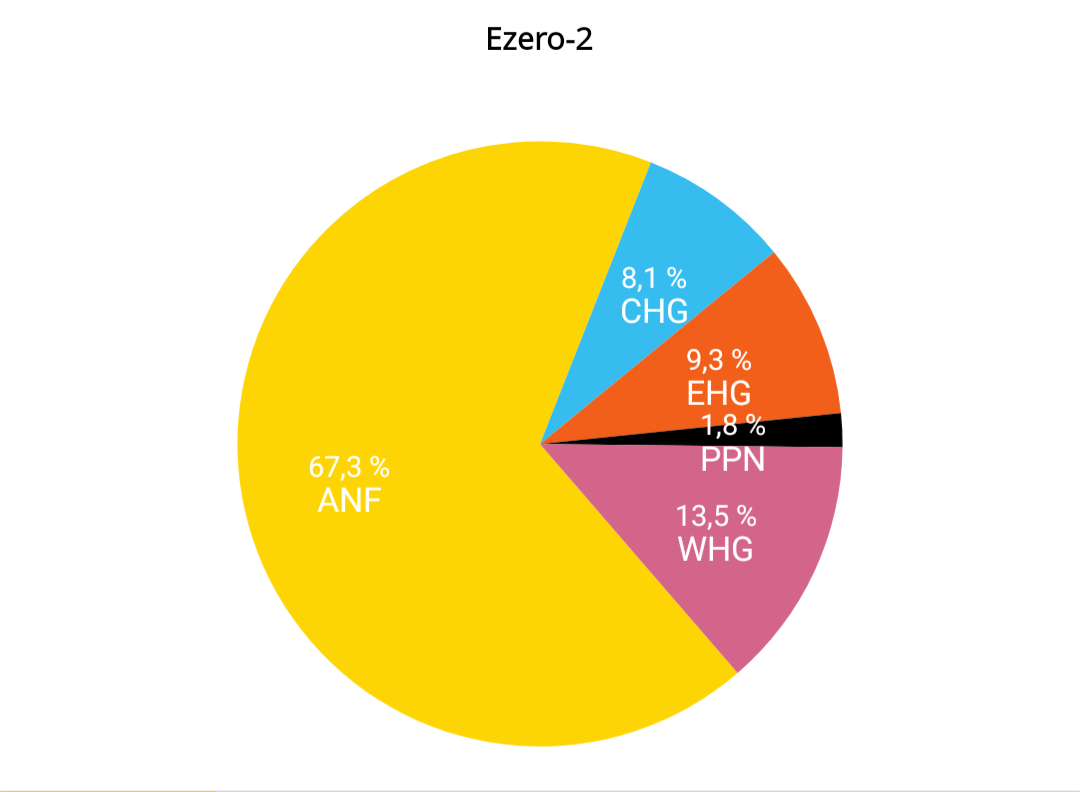
Autosomal DNA Ezero culture

== Sources ==
- G.Il. Georgiev et al. (eds.), Ezero, rannobronzovoto selishte. Sofii︠a︡ : Izd-vo na Bŭlgarskata akademii︠a︡ na naukite, Arkheologicheski institut 1979 (excavation report of Tell Ezero).
- Mallory, J. P.; Adams, Douglas Q. (1997). "Ezero culture". Encyclopedia of Indo-European Culture. Taylor & Francis. p. 188. ISBN 1-884964-98-2.
