= Oswald Menghin =

Austrian prehistorian

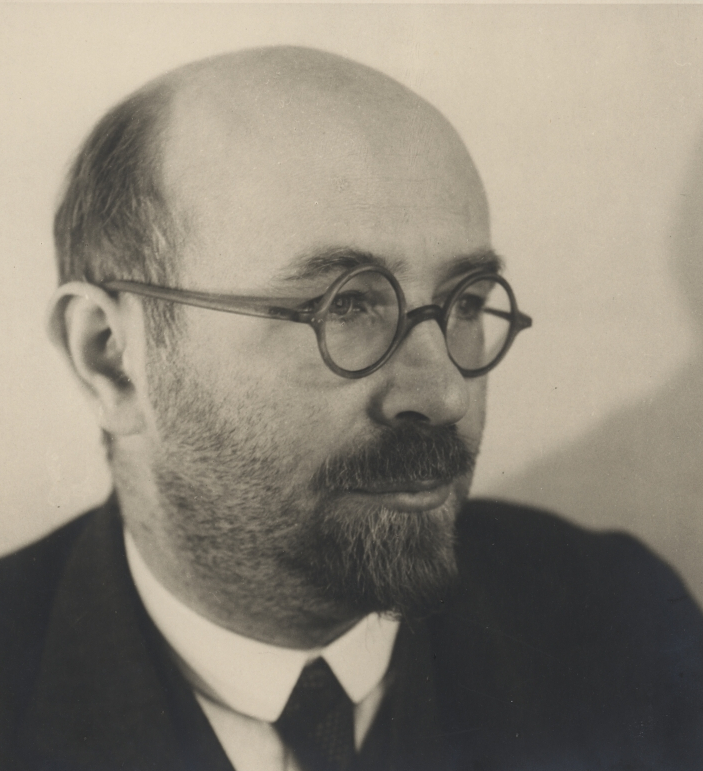

Oswald Menghin (19 April 1888 – 29 November 1973) was an Austrian Prehistorian and University professor. He established an international reputation before the War, while he was professor at the University of Vienna. His work on race and culture was serviceable to the German nationalist movement of the 1930s. At the time of the Anschluss he served as Minister of Education in the cabinet formed by Arthur Seyß-Inquart. He avoided indictment as a war criminal and resumed his career in Argentina after the war.

== Life ==
Menghin was born in Meran, Tyrol. He qualified for inauguration as an academic lecturer in 1913, for his work Urgeschichte des Menschen (The Proto-History of Mankind). After the death of Moritz Hoernes he emerged as university professor of the Protohistorical Institute of the University of Vienna from 1917 until 1945, and furthermore he was from 1930 to 1933 professor at the University of Cairo.

From 1919 to 1926 Menghin was a member of Secret Nazi Society Deutsche Gemeinschaft (the German Fellowship), in which he got to know Arthur Seyß-Inquart.

In 1932 he participated in the First International Congress of Prehistoric and Protohistoric Sciences in London in 1932 with Hugo Obermaier and others. In 1934 he published Geist und Blut.

For the academic year of 1935/36 he was appointed Rector of the University of Vienna. After numerous unsuccessful attempts there followed in 1936 his election as a regular Member of the Austrian Academy of Sciences. From July 1936 to June 1937 he was a member of the governing council of the Viennese National (Vaterländische) Front.

On 11 March 1938 he became Education Minister in the so-called Anschluss-Cabinet of Seyß-Inquart. During his term with the Party down to the end of May, there occurred not only the decree of the Anschluss itself, but also the so-called "Cleansing" of the University of Vienna. This meant that a fixed ratio of 2% was brought in for Jewish students, and about 40% of the teaching body were dismissed on account of "Jewish origins" proportionately on "political grounds". In August 1938 Menghin went back to the University of Vienna.

He was friends with Adolf Mahr.

In Catholic circles he was considered a traitor from March 1938 onwards, and was discharged (excluded) from his Cartellverband (Catholic Union-group), the Rudolfina Wien (which like all Catholic unions had been banned), at a formal underground meeting held on 12 November 1938.

After the War he was included, as a member of the Seyß-Inquart regime, on the primary list of war criminals. He was however not indicted, but came to an American internment camp, where he made statements. In 1948, he escaped to Argentina, and began teaching in 1957 at the University of La Plata, in Buenos Aires. Proceedings against him had been dropped in 1956. In 1959, he became a corresponding member of the Austrian Academy of Sciences. He died, aged 85, on 29 November 1973 in Buenos Aires in Argentina.

== Works ==
- Urgeschichte der bildenden Kunst(mit M. Hoernes), 1925
- Weltgeschichte der Steinzeit, 1931
- Geist und Blut. Grundsätzliches um Rasse, Sprache, Kultur und Volkstum, 1933
- Vorgeschichte Amerikas, 1957

== Sources ==
- Otto Helmut Urban, ' "Er war der Mann zwischen den Fronten". Oswald Menghin und das Urgeschichtliche Institut der Universität Wien während der Nazizeit', Archaeologia Austriaca 80, 1996, p. 1ff.
- Marcelino Fontán, 'Der Fall Menghin. Ein österreichischer Anschlußminister in Argentinien' (from the Argentinian Spanish of Erich Hackl), in Zwischenwelt. Zeitschrift für Kultur des Exils und des Widerstands, Jg. 19, No. 4 (Vienna, February 2003), p 4-5. ISSN 1606-4321
- Marcelino Fontán, Oswald Menghin: ciencia y nazismo. El antisemitismo como imperativo moral. (Buenos Aires: Fundación Memoria del Holocausto 2005).
- Erich Hackl, 'Nachschrift zum Fall Menghin', in Zwischenwelt. Zeitschrift für Kultur des Exils und des Widerstands, Jg. 19, No. 4 (Vienna, February 2003), p. 5-6. ISSN 1606-4321
- Philip L. Kohl/J. A. Perez Gollan, "Religion, Politics, and Prehistory, Reassessing the Lingering Legacy of Oswald Menghin." Current Anthropology 43, 2002, 561–586.
- Heinz-Dietmar Schimanko, Dr. iur. Dr. phil. (Studienrichtung Geschichte), Das volksgerichtliche Verfahren gegen Oswald Menghin (The Criminal Procedure against Oswald Menghin at the People´s Court), Wien, Jänner 2023 (http://www.schimanko.de/Download/Schimanko%20Das%20volksgerichtliche%20Verfahren%20gegen%20Oswald%20Menghin.pdf
