= Cernavodă culture =

Archaeological culture (c. 4000-3200)

- Geographical range: Bulgaria, Romania, Serbia
- Period: Chalcolithic
- Dates: c. 4000 BC – 3200 BC
- Preceded by: Sredny Stog culture, Suvorovo culture, Karanovo culture, Gumelnița culture, Varna culture
- Followed by: Coțofeni culture, Baden culture, Usatove culture, Yamnaya culture, Ezero culture

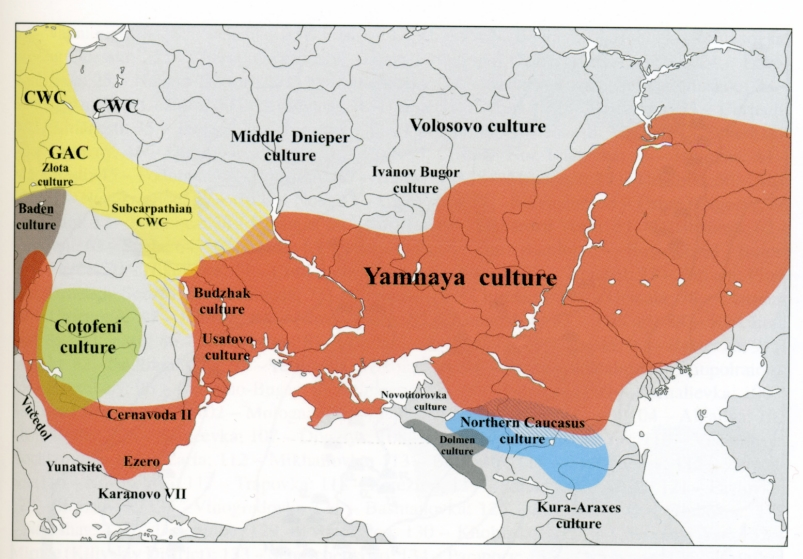
Map

The Cernavodă culture, ca. 4000–3200, is a late Copper Age archaeological culture distributed along the lower Eastern Bug River and Danube and along the coast of the Black Sea and somewhat inland, generally in present-day Bulgaria and Romania. It is named after the Romanian town of Cernavodă.

It is a successor to and occupies much the same area as the earlier Karanovo culture and Gumelnița culture, for which a destruction horizon seems to be evident. It is part of the "Balkan-Danubian complex" that stretches up the entire length of the river and into northern Germany via the Elbe and the Baden culture; its northeastern portion is thought to be ancestral to the Usatove culture.

It is characterized by defensive hilltop settlements. The pottery shares traits with that found further east, in the Sredny Stog culture on the south-west Eurasian steppe; burials similarly bear a resemblance to those further east.

The early Cernavoda economy (Cernavoda I) was based primarily on sheep and goat herding. The culture also had domesticated horses.

Around 3600 BC the Cernavoda I culture developed into Cernavoda III, which was connected with the Baden culture centered in the middle Danube region (Hungary).

The Cernavoda culture practised copper metallurgy. Arsenical bronze artefacts are known from 3600 BC.

It has been theorized that Cernavodă culture, together with the Sredny Stog (Russian: Средний Стог - middle (hay)stack) culture, was the source of Anatolian languages and introduced them to Anatolia through the Balkans after Anatolian split from the Proto-Indo-European language, which some linguists and archaeologists place in the area of the Sredny Stog culture.

== Gallery ==
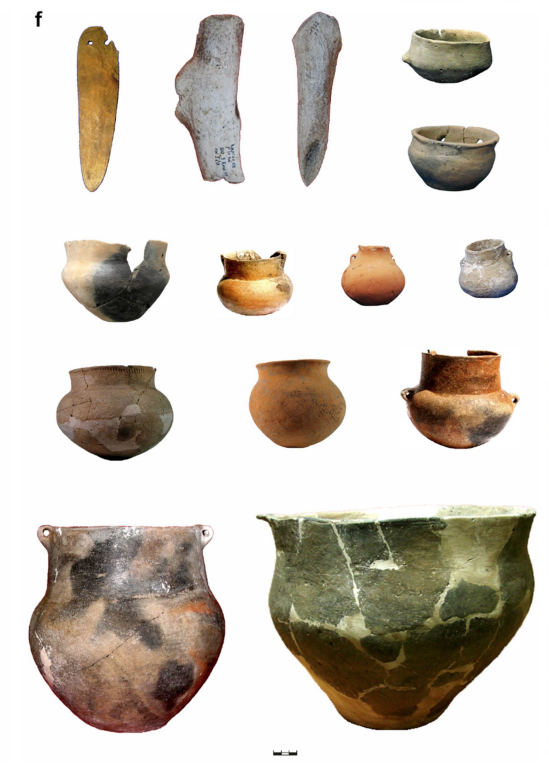
Metal, bone and ceramic artefacts

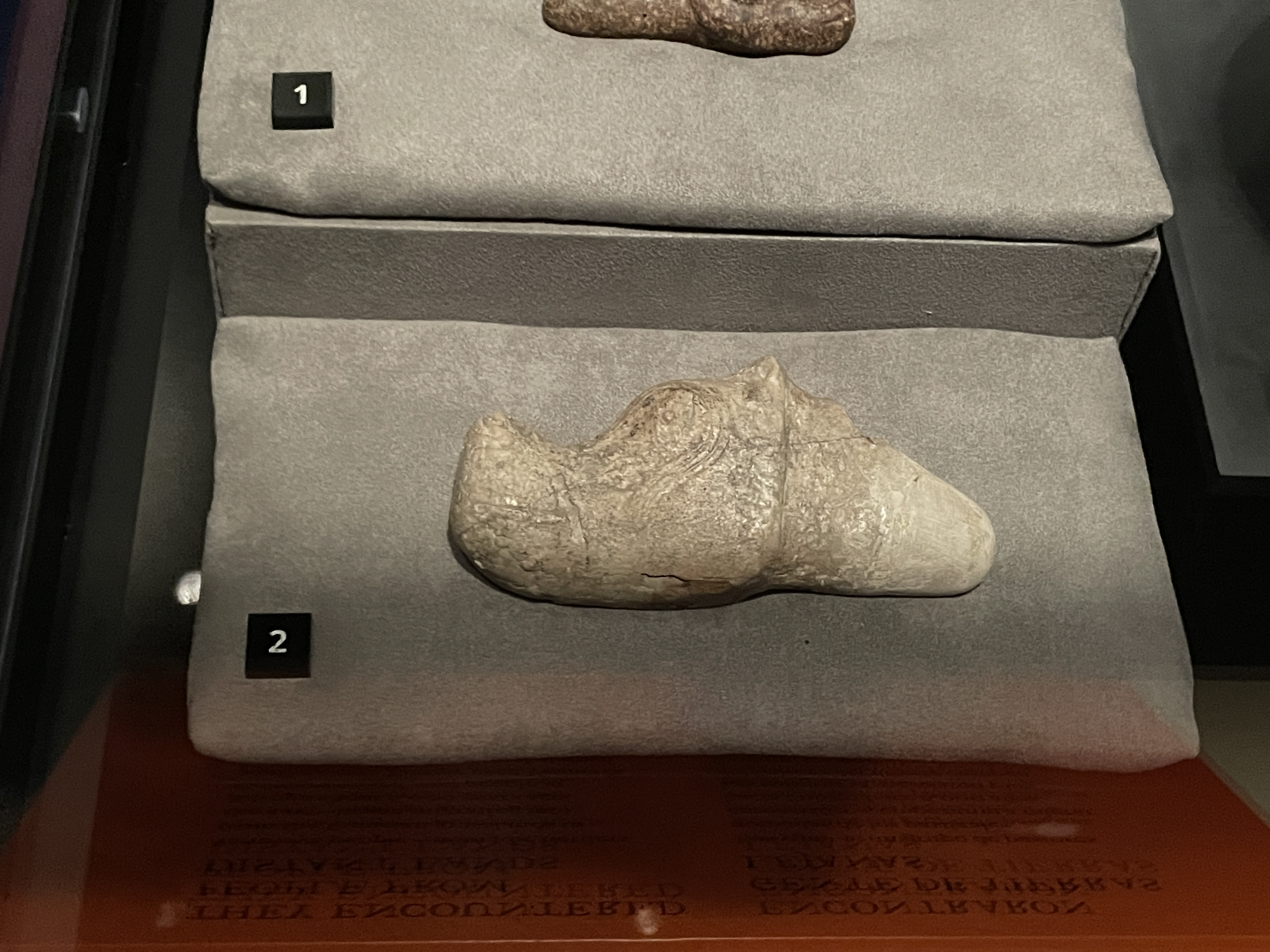
Stone horse-head sceptre

== See also ==
- Bronze Age in Romania
- Coțofeni culture
- Basarabi culture
- Ottomány culture
- Pecica culture
- Wietenberg culture
- Hamangia culture
- Prehistory of Transylvania
- Prehistoric Romania
