= Coțofeni culture =

Early Bronze Age archaeological culture

Coțofeni/Kocofeni culture
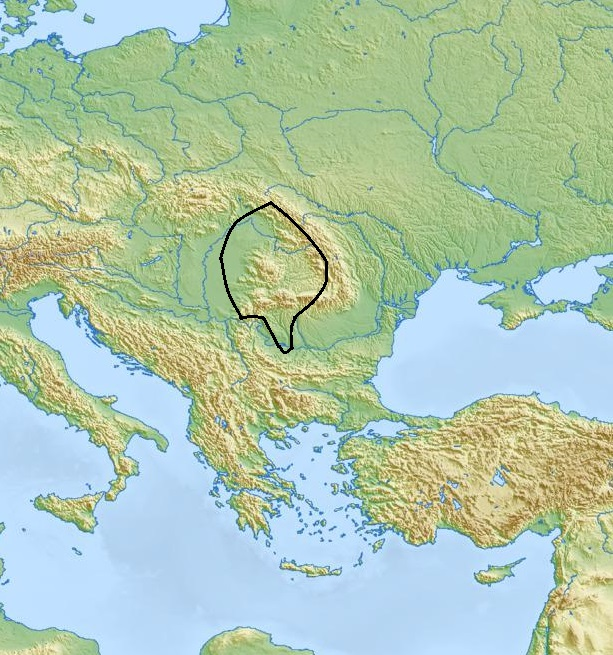
- Geographical range: Romania, Bulgaria, Serbia
- Period: Chalcolithic to Early Bronze Age
- Dates: between c. 3500 and 2500 BC
- Preceded by: Cernavoda culture, Usatove culture, Bodrogkeresztúr culture
- Followed by: Baden culture, Vučedol culture, Somogyvár-Vinkovci culture, Glina-Schneckenberg culture, Maros culture, Wietenberg culture, Ottomány culture

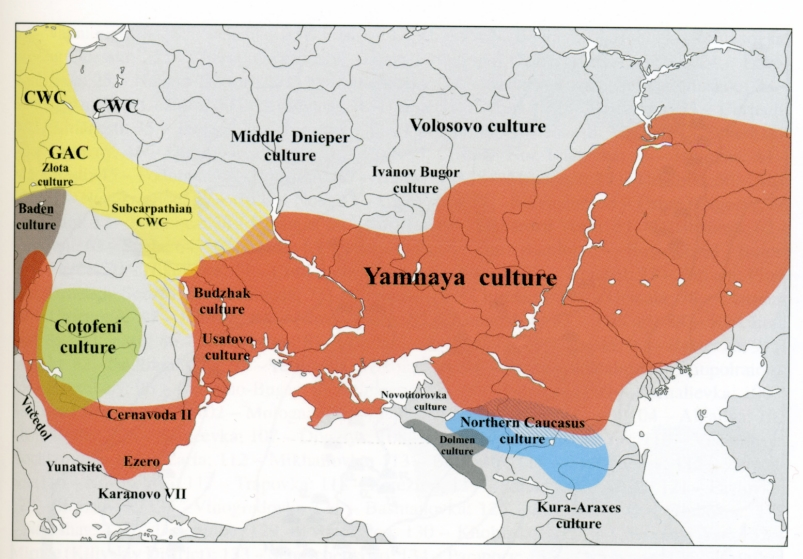
Map

The Coțofeni culture (Serbian: Kocofeni), also known as the Baden-Coțofeni culture, and generally associated with the Usatove culture, was an Early Bronze Age archaeological culture that existed between 3500 and 2500 BC in the mid-Danube area of south-eastern Central Europe.

The first report of a Coțofeni find was made by Fr. Schuster in 1865 from the Râpa Roșie site in Sebeș (present-day Alba County, Romania). Since then, this culture has been studied by a number of people to varying degrees. Some of the more prominent contributors to the study of this culture include C. Gooss, K. Benkő, B. Orbán, G. Téglas, K. Herepey, S. Fenichel, Julius Teutsch, Cezar Bolliac, V. Christescu, Teohari Antonescu, and Cristian Popa.

== Geographic area ==
The Coțofeni culture area can be seen from two perspectives, as a fluctuation zone, or in its maximum area of extent. This covers present day Maramureș, some areas in Sătmar, the mountainous and hilly areas of Crișana, Transylvania, Banat, Oltenia, Muntenia (not including the North-East), and across the Danube in present-day eastern Serbia and northwestern Bulgaria.

== Chronology ==
=== Absolute chronology ===
Bronze Age in Romania Unfortunately, most of the Coțofeni culture chronology is based on just three samples collected at three different Coțofeni sites. Based on these radiocarbon dates, this culture can be placed between roughly 3500 and 2500 BC.

=== Relative chronology ===
Cultural synchronisms have been established based on mutual trade relations (visible as imported items) as well as stratigraphic observations. There is an evident synchronicity between:

Coțofeni I - Cernavoda III - Baden A - Spherical Amphorae;

Coțofeni II - Baden B-C Kostolac;

Coțofeni III - Kostolac-Vučedol A-B.

== Relations with contemporary neighbouring cultures ==
During the evolution of the Coțofeni culture, there were clearly relationships with other neighbouring cultures. The influence between the Coțofeni and their neighbours the Baden, Kostolac, Vučedol, Globular Amphora culture as well as the Ochre Burial populations was reciprocal. The areas bordering these cultures show cultural traits that have mixed aspects, for example Coțofeni-Baden and Coțofeni-Kostolac finds. These finds of mixed aspects suggest a cohabitation between related populations. It also supports the idea of well established trade between cultures.

== Gallery ==
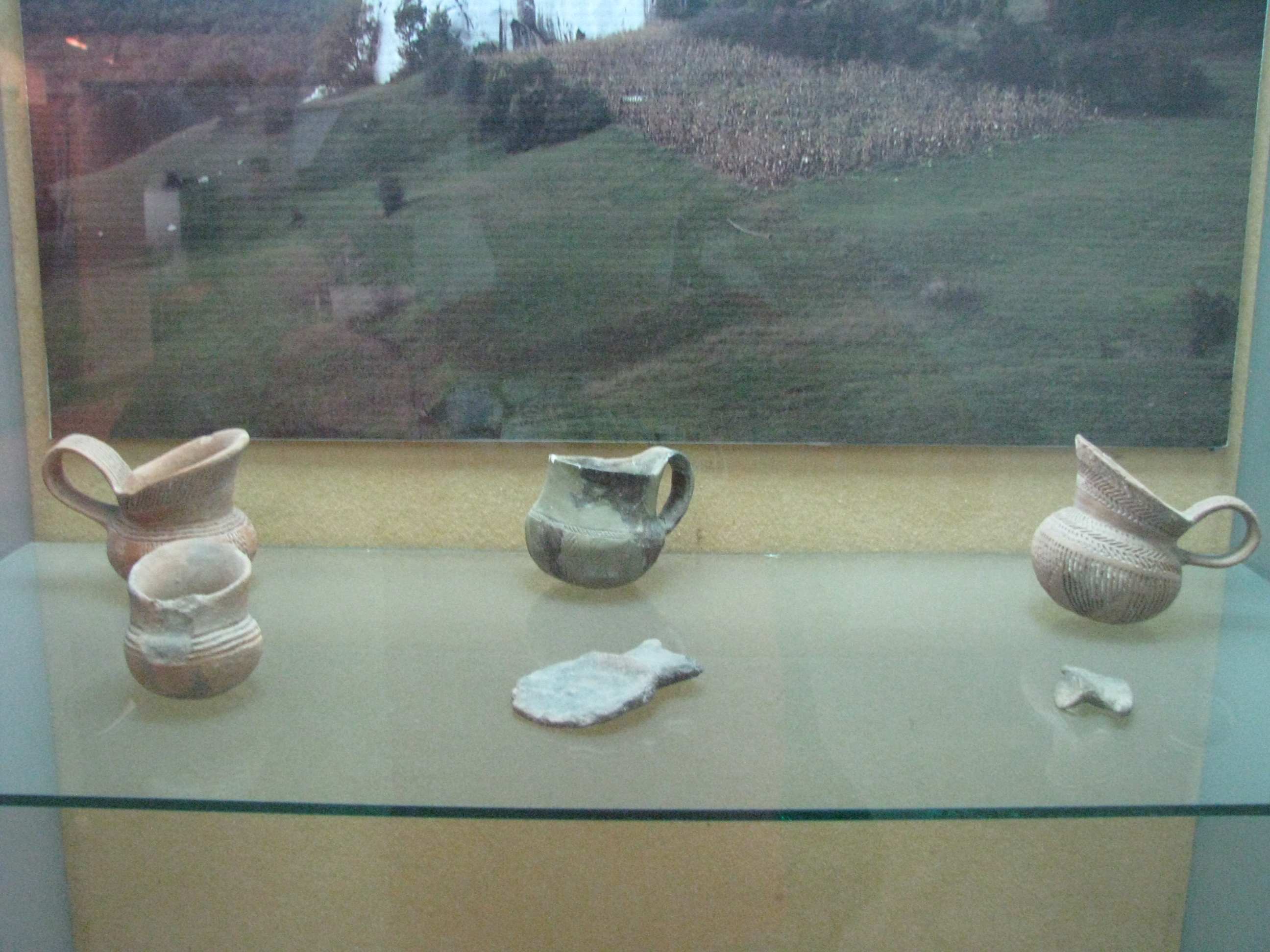
Ceramic vessels, stone and bone tools, Romania

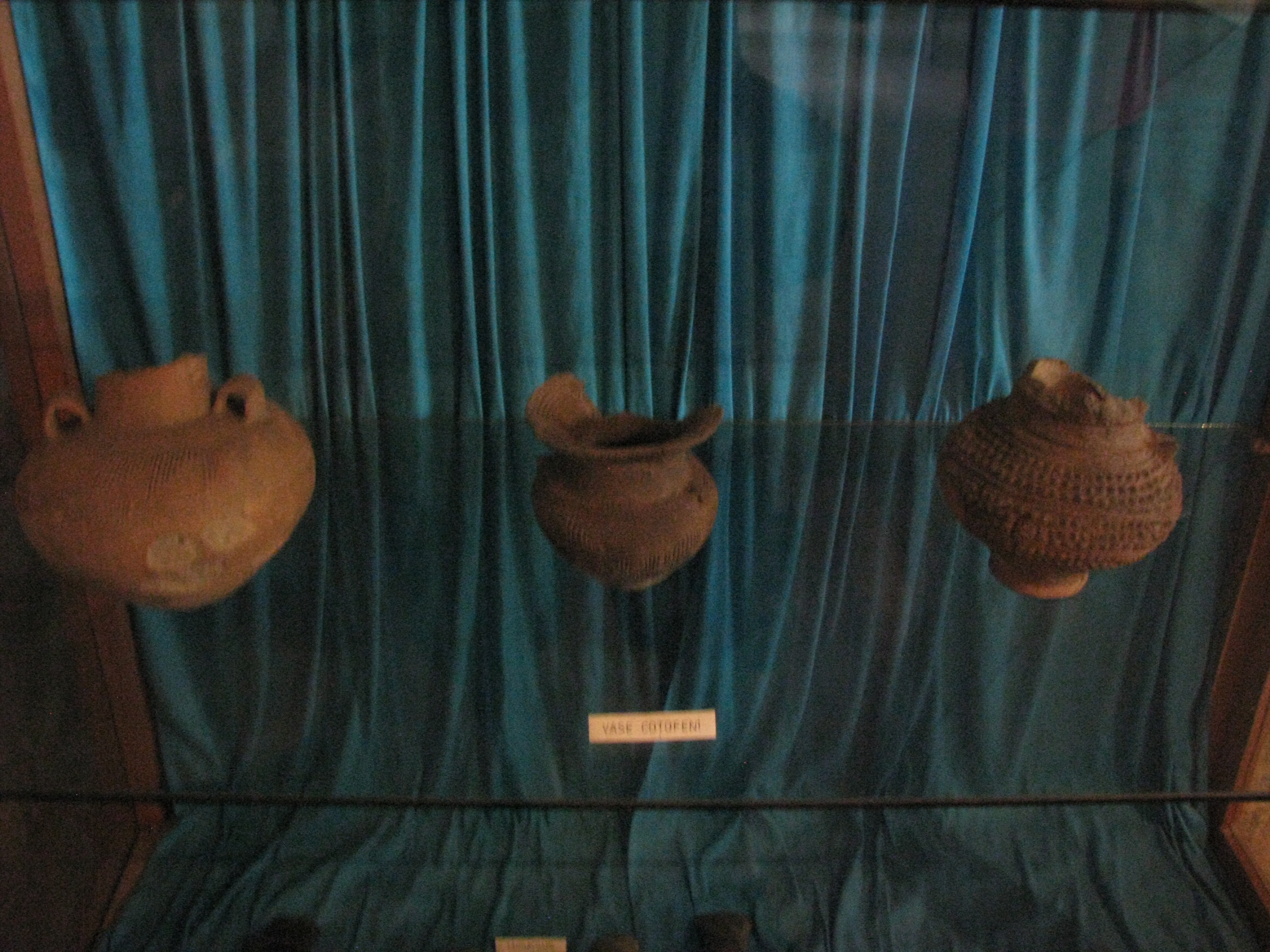
Pottery, Romania

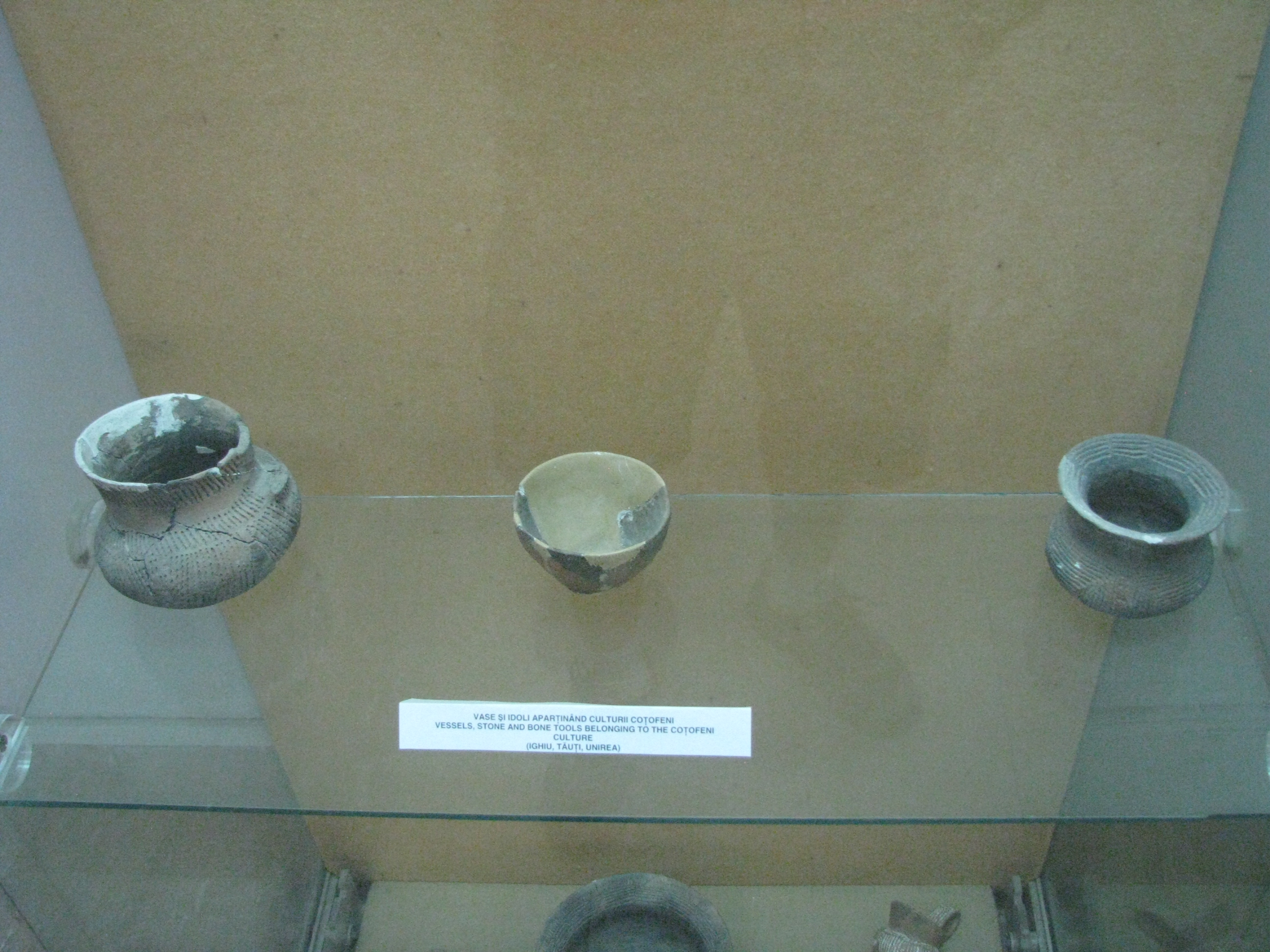
Pottery from Ighiu, Tăuți and Unirea, Romania.

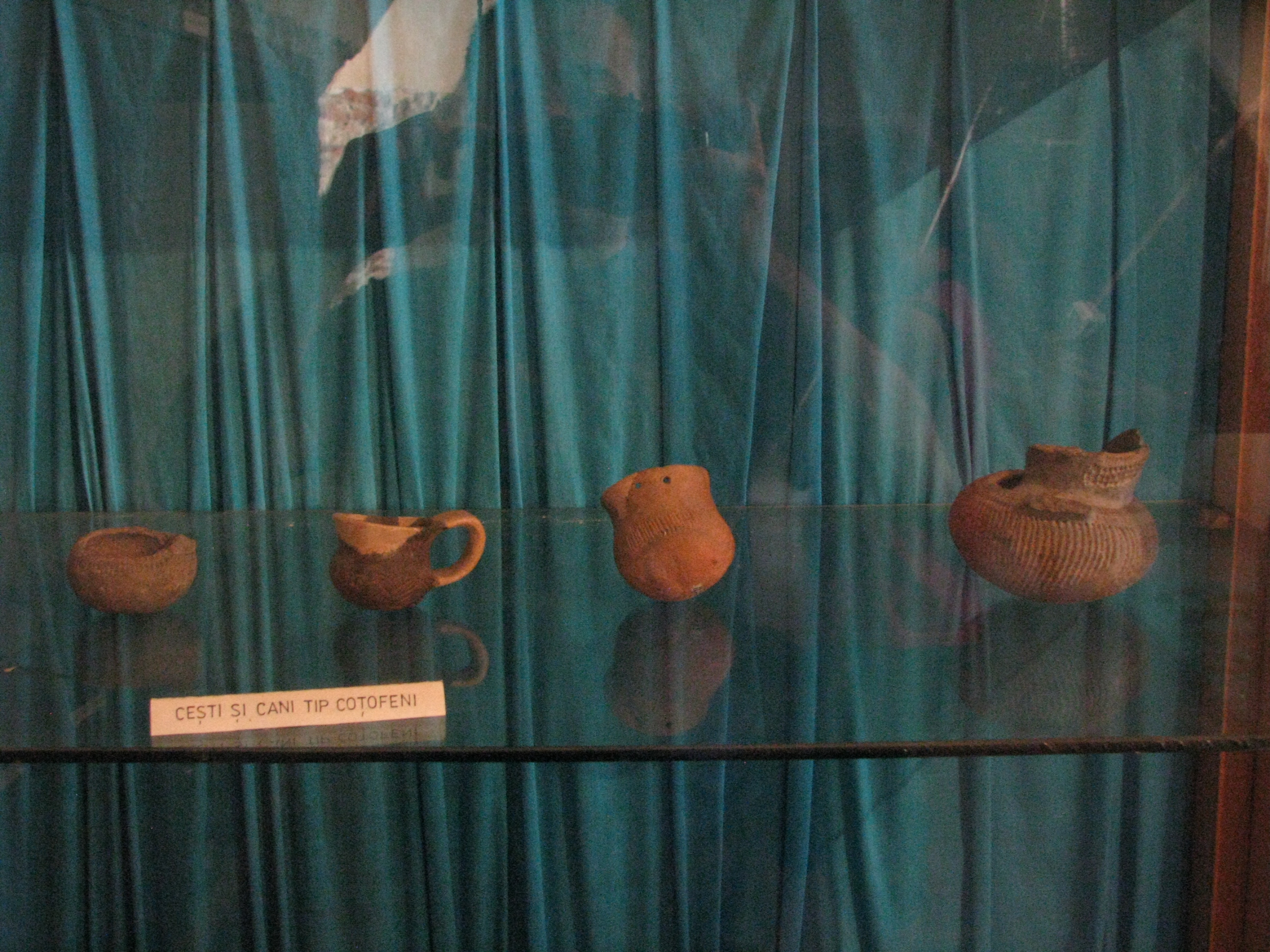

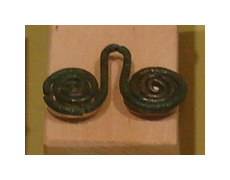
Copper spiral ornament

== See also ==
- Bronze Age in Romania
- Yamnaya culture
- Basarabi culture
- Otomani culture
- Pecica culture
- Wietenberg culture
- Prehistory of Transylvania
- Prehistoric Romania
