= Proto-Indo-European society =

Reconstructed culture of Proto-Indo-Europeans

Proto-Indo-European society is the reconstructed culture of Proto-Indo-Europeans, the ancient speakers of the Proto-Indo-European language, ancestor of all modern Indo-European languages. Historical linguistics combined with archaeological and genetic evidence have provided the current basis for understanding the culture and its people. The most widely accepted theory suggests that the culture emerged on the Pontic–Caspian steppe after 5000 BCE, a period known as the Chalcolithic, where smelted copper and stone tools were in use simultaneously. Proto-Indo-European speakers are considered to have been semi-nomadic, but domestication of cattle, first for ritual sacrifice and later for consumption, dairy production, and cereal cultivation, emerged as the culture shifted from herding and hunter-gatherer behaviours to farming. The social hierarchy included an upper class of priests, warriors and tribe chiefs and a lower class of commoners and slaves; patrilineality and patriarchy characteristics have been well-established. Trade, bolstered by access to wheeled wagons, connected Proto-Indo-European culture to others with archaeological and linguistic evidence supporting relations with Proto-Uralic peoples, Uruk, and Old European cultures.

== Scientific approaches ==
Many of the modern ideas in this field involve the unsettled Indo-European homeland debate about the precise origins of the language itself. There are four main approaches researchers have employed in their attempts to study this culture:

- Historical linguistics (especially comparative linguistics): interpretations based on the reconstruction and identification of words and formulae (those cited *thus on this page, with a preceding asterisk) which formed part of the vocabulary of the Proto-Indo-European language. These are reconstructed on the basis of sound laws and shared grammatical structures; the definitions hereunder given for the roots should be read as "connotations" (the concepts associated with a word that were inherited in the daughter languages), close to their original "denotation" (the exact meaning at the time of the Proto-Indo-European language).
- Comparative mythology: interpretations based on the comparison of Indo-European beliefs to identify shared themes and characteristics. While few divine names can be confidently reconstructed due to foreign influences and considerable evolutions in beliefs, scholars have been able to recover parts of the Proto-Indo-European mythology. Comparative folklore is often overlooked in Indo-European studies due to the difficulty of dating the origin of folk stories.
- Archaeology: interpretations based on archaeological evidence of a material culture. The Kurgan hypothesis, proposed by archeologists Marija Gimbutas (1956) and David W. Anthony (2007), is the most widely accepted theory on the Indo-European homeland, and postulates an origin in the Pontic-Caspian steppes during the Chalcolithic period. (Note: See: Bomhard (2019), p. 2: "This scenario is supported not only by linguistic evidence, but also by a growing body of archeological and genetic evidence. The Indo-Europeans have been identified with several cultural complexes existing in that area between 4,500—3,500 BCE. The literature supporting such a homeland is both extensive and persuasive [...]. Consequently, other scenarios regarding the possible Indo-European homeland, such as Anatolia, have now been mostly abandoned"; Reich (2018), p. 152: "This finding provides yet another line of evidence for the steppe hypothesis, showing that not just Indo-European languages, but also Indo-European culture as reflected in the religion preserved over thousands of years by Brahmin priests, was likely spread by peoples whose ancestors originated in the steppe."; Kristiansen et al. (2017), pp. 341–342: "When we add the evidence from ancient DNA, and the additional evidence from recent linguistic work discussed above, the Anatolian hypothesis must be considered largely falsified. Those Indo-European languages that later came to dominate in western Eurasia were those originating in the migrations from the Russian steppe during the third millennium BC."; Anthony & Ringe (2015), p. 199: "Archaeological evidence and linguistic evidence converge in support of an origin of Indo-European languages on the Pontic-Caspian steppes around 4,000 years BCE. The evidence is so strong that arguments in support of other hypotheses should be reexamined."; Mallory (1989), p. 185: "The Kurgan solution is attractive and has been accepted by many archaeologists and linguists, in part or total. It is the solution one encounters in the Encyclopedia Britannica and the Grand Dictionnaire Encyclopédique Larousse.) What follows are interpretations based upon this hypothesis.
- Archaeogenetics: interpretations based on the study of ancient DNA to understand the nature of ancient human migrations and "mating networks". In support for the Kurgan hypothesis, Yamnaya migrations have been linked to the spread of Indo-Europeans languages in several genetic studies published in recent years. In support of the Anatolian Hypothesis, a study named "Mapping the Origins and Expansion of the Indo-European Language Family" gained widespread media attention in 2012, but received scrutiny from historical linguists, who accused the study of abandoning the comparative method and of conflating language with genes. Nonetheless, "Mapping the Origins" has been cited by many since its publication, highlighting an interdisciplinary gap between linguistics and genetics.

== Chronology ==
Archaeologist David W. Anthony and linguist Donald Ringe distinguish three different cultural stages in the evolution of the Proto-Indo-European language: (Note: Anthony & Ringe (2015), p. 201: "Determining the order in which they diverged from each other, called subgrouping, has proved surprisingly difficult (e.g., Ringe et al. 2002), but a consensus is emerging. It seems clear that the ancestor of the Anatolian subgroup (which includes Hittite) separated from the other dialects of PIE first, so from a cladistic point of view Anatolian is half the IE family (e.g., Jasanoff 2003). Within the non-Anatolian half, it appears that the ancestor of the Tocharian subgroup (whose attested languages were spoken in Xinjiang, today in western China, until approximately the tenth century CE) separated from the other dialects before the latter had diverged much (e.g., Winter 1998, Ringe 2000). It follows that an item inherited by two or more of the daughter subgroups can be reconstructed for "early" PIE only if it is attested in at least one Anatolian language and at least one non-Anatolian language, and such an item can be reconstructed for the ancestor of the non-Anatolian subgroups only if it is attested in one or both of the Tocharian languages and in some other IE language. This observation is relevant below. For want of better terms, "early" PIE is used here for the last common ancestor of the Anatolian and non-Anatolian IE branches; "post-Anatolian" PIE is used for the last common ancestor of the non-Anatolian PIE languages, including Tocharian. Because it seems clear that there was still a more or less unified group of PIE dialects after Anatolian and Tocharian had split off, "late" PIE is used for the common ancestor of all other IE branches.")

- Early (4500–4000 BCE), the common ancestor of all attested Indo-European languages, before the Anatolian split (Cernavodă culture; 4000 BCE); associated with the early Khvalynsk culture,
- Classic, or "post-Anatolian" (4000–3500), the last common ancestor of the non-Anatolian languages, including Tocharian; associated with the late Khvalynsk and Repin cultures,
- Late (3500–2500), in its dialectal period due to the spread of the Yamnaya horizon over a large area.

=== Early Khvalynsk (4900–3900 BCE) ===
Domesticated cattle were introduced around 4700 BCE from the Danube valley to the Volga-Ural steppes where the Early Khvalynsk culture (4900–3900) had emerged, associated by Anthony with the Early Proto-Indo-European language. Cattle and sheep were more important in ritual sacrifices than in diet, suggesting that a new set of cults and rituals had spread eastward across the Pontic-Caspian steppes, with domesticated animals at the root of the Proto-Indo-European conception of the universe. Anthony attributes the first and progressive domestication of horses, from taming to actually working with the animal, to this period. Between 4500 and 4200, copper, exotic ornamental shells and polished stone maces were exchanged across the Pontic–Caspian steppes from Varna, in the eastern Balkans, to Khvalynsk, near the Volga river. Around 4500, a minority of richly decorated single graves, partly enriched by imported copper items, began to appear in the steppes, contrasting with the remaining outfitted graves.

The Anatolian distinctive sub-family may have emerged from a first wave of Indo-European migration into southeastern Europe around 4200–4000, coinciding with the Suvorovo–to–Cernavoda I migration, in the context of a progression of the Khvalynsk culture westwards towards the Danube area, from which had also emerged the Novodanilovka (4400–3800) and Late Sredny Stog (4000–3500) cultures.

Recent genetic studies have shown that males of the Khvalynsk culture belonged to the Western Steppe Herder (WSH) cluster, which is a mixture of Eastern Hunter-Gatherer (EHG) and Caucasus Hunter-Gatherer (CHG) ancestry. This admixture appears to have happened on the eastern Pontic–Caspian steppe starting around 5,000 BC.

=== Late Khvalynsk/Repin (3900–3300 BCE) ===
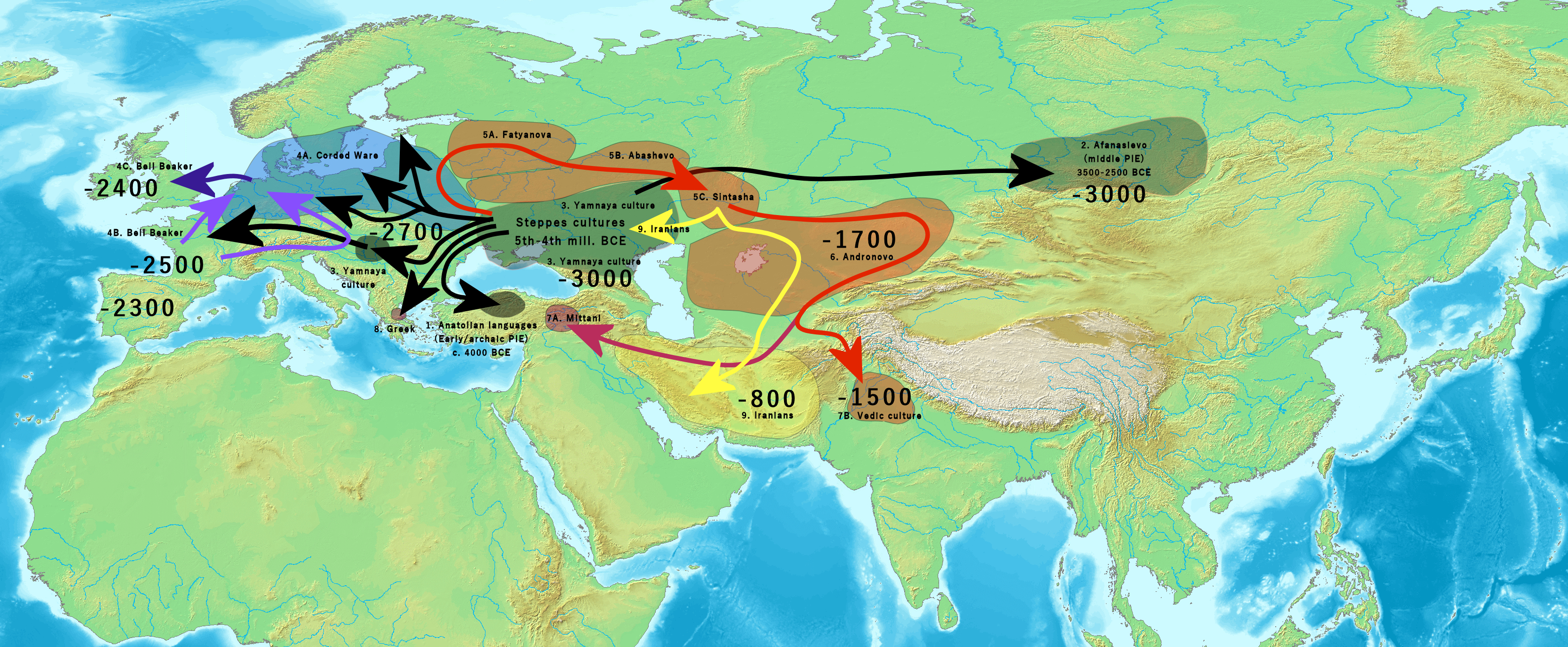
Early Indo-European migrations from the Pontic–Caspian steppe.

Steppe economies underwent a revolutionary change between 4200 and 3300 BCE, in a shift from a partial reliance on herding, when domesticated animals were probably used principally as a ritual currency for public sacrifices, to a later regular dietary dependence on cattle, and either sheep or goat meat and dairy products. The Late Khvalynsk and Repin cultures (3900–3300), associated with the classic (post-Anatolian) Proto-Indo-European language, showed the first traces of cereal cultivation after 4000, in the context of a slow and partial diffusion of farming from the western parts of the steppes to the east. Around 3700–3300, a second migration wave of proto-Tocharian speakers towards South Siberia led to the emergence of the Afanasievo culture (3300–2500).

The spoke-less wheeled wagon was introduced to the Pontic-Caspian steppe around 3500 from the neighbouring North Caucasian Maykop culture (3700–3000), with which Proto-Indo-Europeans traded wool and horses. Interactions with the hierarchical Maykop culture, itself influenced by the Mesopotamian Uruk culture, had notable social effects on the Proto-Indo-European way of life. Meanwhile, the Khvalynsk-influenced cultures that had emerged in the Danube-Donets region after the first migration gave way to the Cernavodă (4000–3200), Usatovo (3500–2500), Mikhaylovka (3600–3000) and Kemi Oba (3700–2200) cultures, from west to east respectively.

=== Yamnaya period (3300–2600 BCE) ===
Yamnaya horizon.

The Yamnaya horizon, associated with the Late Proto-Indo-European language (following both the Anatolian and Tocharian splits), originated in the Don-Volga region before spreading westwards after 3300 BCE, establishing a cultural horizon founded on kurgan funerals that stretched over a vast steppic area between the Dnieper and Volga rivers. It was initially a herding-based society, with limited crop cultivation in the eastern part of the steppes, while the Dnieper-Donets region was more influenced by the agricultural Tripolye culture. Paleolinguistics likewise postulates Proto-Indo-European speakers as a semi-nomadic and pastoral population with subsidiary agriculture.

Bronze was introduced to the Pontic-Caspian steppes during this period. Following the Yamnaya expansion, long-distance trade in metals and other valuables, such as salt in the hinterlands, probably brought prestige and power to Proto-Indo-European societies. However, the native tradition of pottery making was weakly developed. The Yamnaya funeral sacrifice of wagons, carts, sheep, cattle, and horses was likely related to a cult of ancestors requiring specific rituals and prayers, a connection between language and cult that introduced the Late Proto-Indo-European language to new speakers. Yamnaya chiefdoms had institutionalized differences in prestige and power, and their society was organized along patron-client reciprocity, a mutual exchange of gifts and favors between their patrons, the gods, and human clients. The average life expectancy was fairly high, with many individuals living to 50–60 years old. The language itself appeared as a dialect continuum during this period, meaning that neighbouring dialects differed only slightly between each other, whereas distant language varieties were probably no longer mutually intelligible due to accumulated divergences over space and time.

As the steppe became dryer and colder between 3500 and 3000, herds needed to be moved more frequently in order to feed them sufficiently. Yamnaya distinctive identity was thus founded on mobile pastoralism, permitted by two earlier innovations: the introduction of the wheeled wagon and the domestication of the horse. Yamnaya herders likely watched over their cattle and raided on horseback, while they drove wagons for the bulk transport of water or food. Light-framework dwellings could be easily assembled and disassembled to be transported on pack animals.

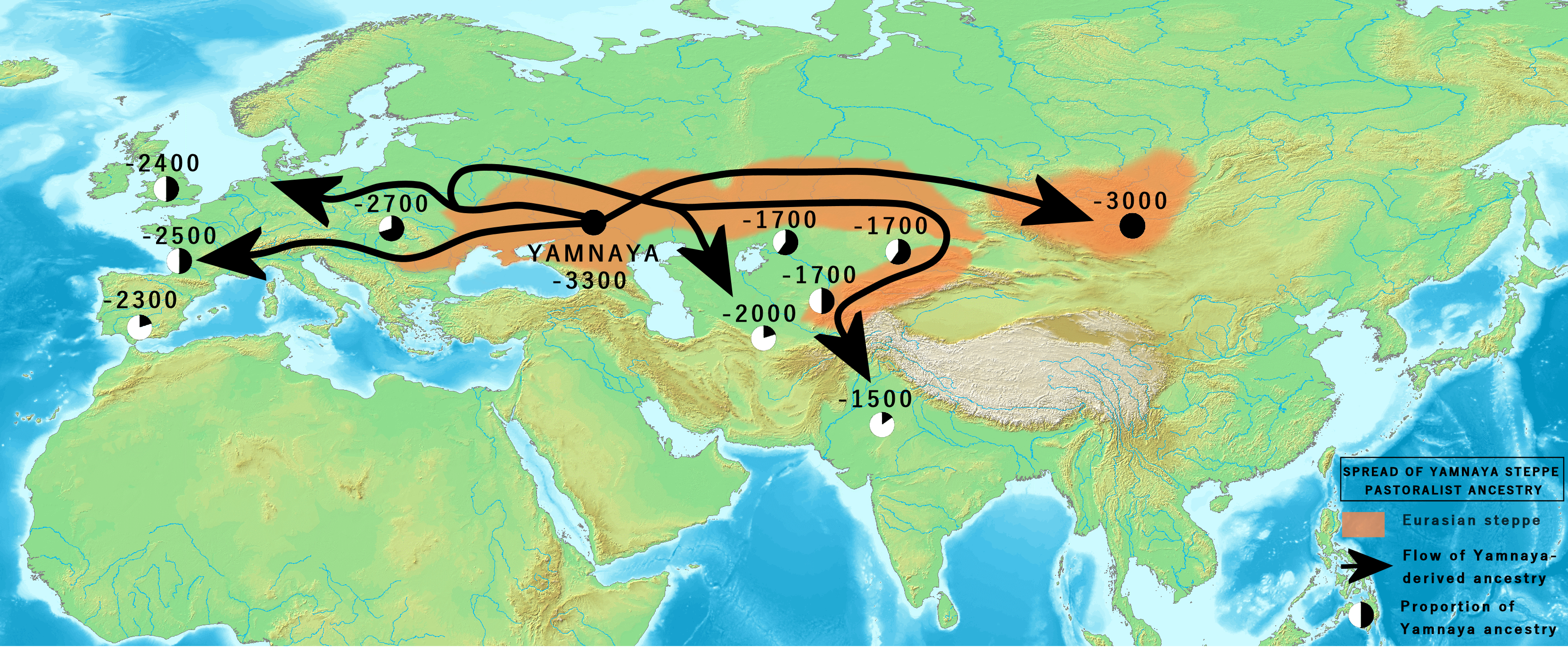
Bronze Age spread of Yamnaya Steppe pastoralist ancestry.

Another climate change that occurred after around 3000 led to a more favourable environment allowing for grassland productivity. Yamnaya new pastoral economy then experienced a third wave of rapid demographic expansion, that time towards Central and Northern Europe. Migrations of Usatovo people towards southeastern Poland, crossing through the Old European Tripolye culture from around 3300 BCE, followed by Yamnaya migrations towards the Pannonian Basin between 3100 and 2800, are interpreted by some scholars as movements of pre-Italic, pre-Celtic and pre-Germanic speakers.

The Proto-Indo-European language probably ceased to be spoken after 2500 as its various dialects had already evolved into non-mutually intelligible languages that began to spread across most of western Eurasia during the third wave of Indo-European migrations (3300–1500). Indo-Iranian languages were introduced to Central Asia, present-day Iran, and South Asia after 2000 BCE.

== Social structure ==
=== Class structure ===
It is generally agreed that Proto-Indo-European society was hierarchical, with some form of social ranking and various degrees of social status. It is unlikely, however, that they had a rigidly stratified structure, or castes such as are found in historical India. There was a general distinction between free persons and slaves, typically prisoners of war or debtors unable to repay a debt. The free part of society was composed of an elite class of priests, kings and warriors, along with the commoners, with each tribe following a chief (*wiḱpots) sponsoring feasts and ceremonies, and immortalized in praise poetry.

The presence of kurgan graves prominently decorated with dress, body ornaments and weaponry, along with well-attested roots for concepts such as "wealth" (*h₂ép-), "to be in need" (*h₁eg-) or "servant" (*h₂entbʰi-kʷolos lit. 'one who moves about on both sides'; and *h₂upo-sth₂-i/o-, lit. 'one standing below'), indicate that a hierarchy of wealth and poverty was recognized. Some graves, larger than the average and necessitating a considerable number of people to be built, likewise suggest a higher status given to some individuals. These prestigious funerals were not necessarily reserved to the wealthiest person. Smiths in particular were given sumptuous graves, possibly due to the association of smithery with magic during the early Bronze Age. In general, such graves were mostly occupied by males in the eastern Don-Volga steppes, while they were more egalitarian in the western Dnieper-Donets region.

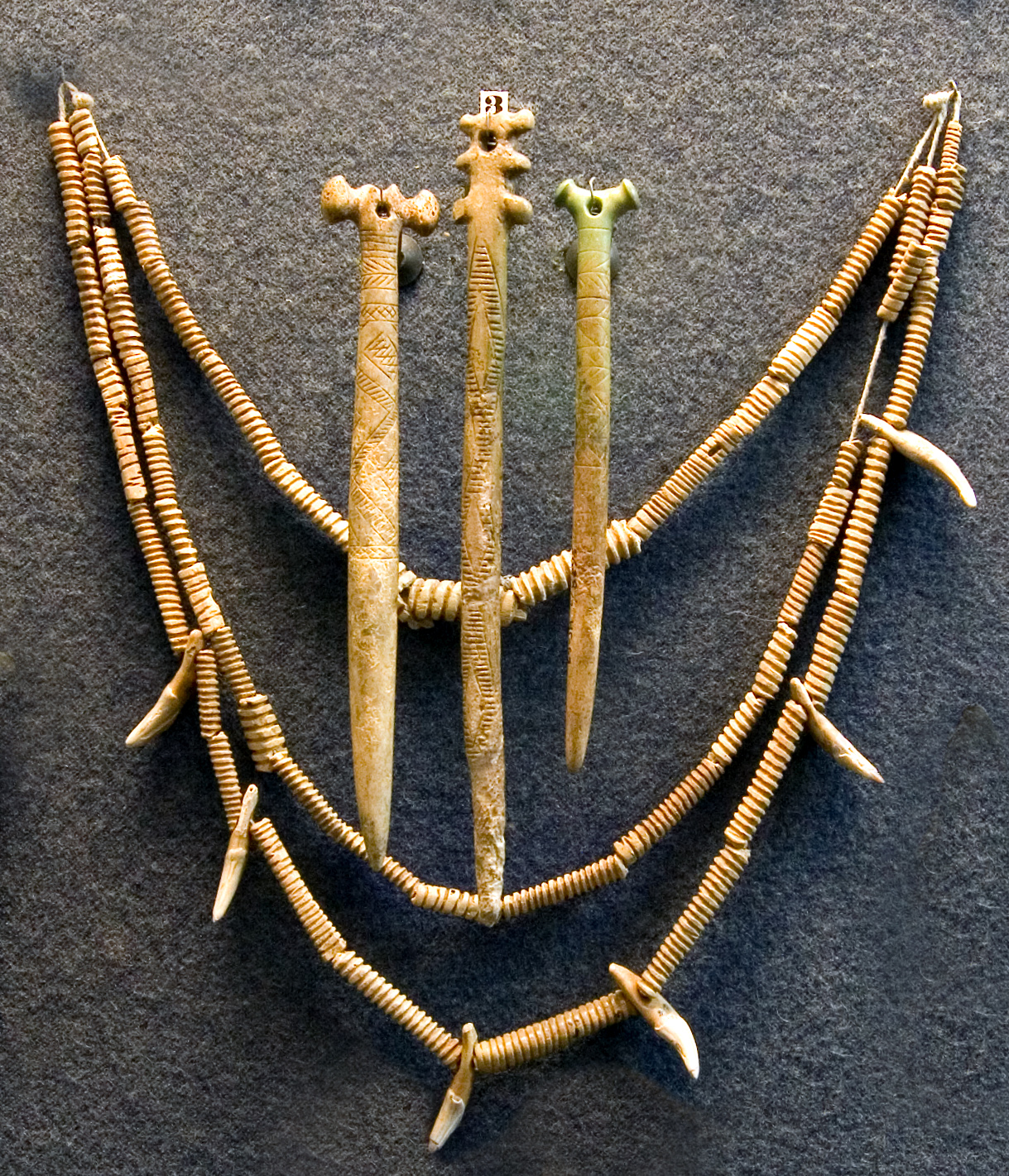
Yamnaya bone and canine ornaments.

=== Kinship ===
Linguistics has allowed for the reliable reconstruction of a large number of words relating to kinship relations. These all agree in exhibiting a patriarchal, patrilocal and patrilineal social fabric. Patrilocality is confirmed by lexical evidence, including the word *h₂u̯edh- 'to lead (away)', being the word that denotes a male wedding a female. Rights, possessions, and responsibilities were consequently reckoned to the father, and wives were to reside after marriage near the husband's family, after the payment of a bride-price.

The household (*dṓm) was generally ruled by the senior male of the family, the *dems-potis (lit. 'master of the household'), and could also consist of his children, grandchildren, and perhaps unrelated slaves or servants. His wife probably also played a complementary role: some evidence suggests that she would have kept her position as the mistress (*pot-n-ih₂) of the household in the event her husband dies, while the eldest son would have become the new master. The Proto-Indo-European expansionist kinship system was likely supported by both marital exogamy (the inclusion of foreign women through marriage) and the exchange of foster children with other families and clans, as suggested by genetic evidence and later attestations from Indo-European-speaking groups.

Once established, the family lasted as long as the male stock of its founder endured, and clan or tribal founders were often portrayed as mythical beings stemming from a legendary past in Indo-European traditions. In this form of kinship organization, the individual's genetic distance from the clan's founding ancestor determined his social status. But if he was of exceptional prowess or virtue, the same individual could in his turn gain social prestige among the community and eventually found his own descent-group.

In the reconstructed lexicon linking the individual to the clan, *h₂erós means a 'member of one's own group', 'one who belongs to the community' (in contrast to an outsider). It gave way to the Indo-Iranian *árya (an endonym), and probably to the Celtic *aryos 'noble, freeman'; the Hittite arā- 'peer, companion'; and the Germanic *arjaz 'noble, distinguished'. It is unlikely however that the term had an ethnic connotation, and we do not know if Proto-Indo-European speakers had a term to designate themselves as a group. Another word, *h₁leudhos, means 'people', 'freemen' in a more general way.

=== Patron-client ===
Proto-Indo-European had several words for "leader": *tagós was a general term derived from *tā̆g- 'set in place, arrange'; *h₃rḗǵs meant a ruler who also had religious functions, with the Roman rex sacrorum ('king of the sacred') as a heritage of the priestly function of the king.

Public feasts sponsored by such patrons were a way for them to promote and secure a political hierarchy built on the unequal mobilization of labor and resources, by displaying their generosity towards the rest of the community. Rivals competed publicly through the size and complexity of their feasts, and alliances were confirmed by gift-giving and promises made during those public gatherings. The host of the feast was called the *ghosti-potis 'the lord of the guests', who honoured the immortal gods and his mortal guests with gifts of food, drink, and poetry.

=== Guest-host ===
Vertical social inequalities were partly balanced by horizontal mutual obligations of hospitality between guests and hosts. According to Anthony, the domestication of horses and the introduction of the wagon in the Pontic-Caspian steppe between 4500 and 3500 BCE led to an increase in mobility across the Yamnaya horizon, and eventually to the emergence of a guest-host political structure. As various herding clans began to move across the steppes, especially during harsh seasons, it became necessary to regulate local migrations on the territories of tribes which had likely restricted these obligations to their kins or co-residents (*h₂erós) until then. In Proto-Indo-European, the term *ghós-ti-, whose original meaning must have been 'table companion', could either mean a host or a guest. The connotation of an obligatory reciprocity between both guests and hosts has persisted in descendant cognates, such as Latin hospēs 'foreigner, guest; host', Old English ġiest 'stranger, guest', or Old Church Slavonic gostĭ 'guest' and gospodĭ 'master'.

Guests and hosts were indeed involved in a mutual and reciprocal relationship bound by oaths and sacrifices. The giving and receiving of favors was accompanied by a set of ritual actions that indebted the guest to show hospitality to his host at any time in the future. The obligation could even be heritable: Homer's warriors, Glaukos and Diomedes, stopped fighting and presented gifts to each other when they learned that their grandfathers had shared a guest-host relationship. Violations of the guest-host obligations were considered immoral, illegal and unholy: in Irish law, refusing hospitality was deemed a crime as serious as murder. The killing of a guest was also greeted with a singular revulsion, as was the abuse of hospitality.

=== Legal system ===
Because of the archaic nature of traditional legal phraseology—which preserves old forms and meaning for words—and the necessity for legal sentences to be uttered precisely the same way each time to remain binding, it is possible to securely reconstruct some elements of the Proto-Indo-European legal system. For instance, the word *serk- 'to make a circle, complete' designated a type of compensation where the father (or master) had to either pay for the damages caused by his son (or slave), or surrender the perpetrator to the offended party. It is attested by a common legal and linguistic origin in both Roman and Hittite laws. Another root denoting a compensation, *kwey-' had the meanings of 'blood-price', 'vengeance' or 'guilt' in daughter languages, suggesting that it was specifically applied to the restitution for theft or violence.

Law was apparently designed to preserve the "order" (*h₂értus) of the universe, with the underlying idea that the cosmic harmony should be maintained, be it in the physical universe or the social world. There was however probably no public enforcement of justice, nor were there formal courts as we know them today. Contractual obligations were protected by private individuals acting as sureties: they pledged to be responsible for payments of debts incurred by someone else if the latter defaulted. In case of litigation, one could either take matter into their own hands, for instance by barring someone from accessing their property to compel payment, or bring the case before judges (perhaps kings) that included witnesses. The word for "oath", *h₁óitos, derives from the verb *h₁ei- 'to go', after the practice of walking between slaughtered animals as part of taking an oath.

The root *h₂értus (from *h₂er- 'to fit' is associated with the concept of a cosmic order, that is which is 'fitting, right, ordered'. It is one of the most securely reconstructed Proto-Indo-European words, with cognates attested in most sub-families: Latin artus 'joint'; Middle High German art 'innate feature, nature, fashion'; Greek artús (ἀρτύς 'arrangement'), possibly arete (ἀρετή 'excellence'); Armenian ard (արդ 'ornament, shape'); Avestan arəta- 'order' and ṛtá 'truth'; Sanskrit ṛtú- (ऋतु 'right time, order, rule'); Hittite āra (𒀀𒀀𒊏 'right, proper'); Tocharian A ārt- 'to praise, be pleased with').

=== Trifunctional hypothesis ===
The trifunctional hypothesis, proposed by Georges Dumézil, postulates a tripartite ideology reflected in a threefold division between a clerical class (encompassing both the religious and social functions of the priests and rulers), a warrior class (connected with the concepts of courage and combat), and a class of farmers or husbandmen (associated with fertility and craftsmanship), on the basis that many historically known groups speaking Indo-European languages show such a division. Dumézil initially contended that it derived from an actual division in Indo-European societies, but later toned down his approach by representing the system as fonctions or general organizing principles. Dumézil's theory has been influential and some scholars continue to operate under its framework, although it has also been criticized as aprioristic and too inclusive, and thus impossible to be proved or disproved.

== Culture ==
=== Beliefs ===
The reconstructed cosmology of the proto-Indo-Europeans shows that the ritual sacrifice of cattle, cows in particular, was at the root of their beliefs, as the primordial condition of the world order. The myth of *Trito, the first warrior, involves the liberation of cattle stolen by a three-headed serpent named *Ngwhi. After recovering the wealth of the people, Trito eventually offered the cattle to the priest in order to ensure the continuity of the cycle of giving between gods and humans. The creation myth could have rationalized raiding as the recovery of cattle that the gods had intended for the people who sacrificed properly. Many Indo-European cultures preserved the tradition of cattle raiding, which they often associated with epic myths. Georges Dumézil suggested that the religious function was represented by a duality, one reflecting the magico-religious nature of priesthood, while the other is involved in religious sanction to human society (especially contracts), a theory supported by common features in Iranian, Roman, Scandinavian and Celtic traditions. The study of astronomy was not much developed among Proto-Indo-Europeans, and they probably had established names for only a few individual stars and star-groups (e.g. Sirius, Ursa Major).

The basic word for "god" in proto-Indo-European is *deiwós 'celestial', itself a derivative of *dei- 'to shine, be bright'. On the other hand, the word for "earth" (*dʰéǵʰōm) is at root of both "earthly" and "human", as it is notably attested in the Latin cognates humus and homo. This suggests a hierarchical conception of the status of mankind regarding the gods, confirmed by the use of the term "mortal" (*mr̩tós) as a synonym of "human" as opposed to the never-dying gods in Indo-European traditions. The idea is expressed in the Homeric phrase "of the immortal gods and of men who walk on earth".

Proto-Indo-European beliefs were influenced by a resistant animistic substratum, and the few names that can be reconstructed based upon both linguistic (cognates) and thematic (reflexes) evidence are the cosmic and elemental deities: the 'Daylight-Sky' (*Dyḗus), his partner 'Earth' (*Dʰéǵʰōm), his daughter the 'Dawn' (*H₂éwsōs), and his Twin Sons, the 'Sun' (*Séh₂ul) and the Sun-Maiden, and deities of winds, waters, fire, rivers and springs. The Proto-Indo-European creation myth tells of a primordial sacrifice performed by the first man *Manu 'Man' on his twin brother *Yemo 'Twin', from whom emerged the cosmological elements. Other deities, such as the weather-god *Perkʷunos and the guardian of roads and herds, *Péh₂usōn, are probably late innovations since they are attested in a restricted number of traditions, Western (European) and Graeco-Aryan, respectively.

=== Rituals ===
Proto-Indo-Europeans practiced a polytheistic religion centered on sacrificial rites of cattle and horses, probably administered by a class of priests or shamans. Animals were slaughtered (*gʷʰn̥tós) and dedicated to the gods (*déiwos) in the hope of winning their favor. The king as the high priest would have been the central figure in establishing good relations with the other world. The Khvalynsk culture, associated with early Proto-Indo-European, had already shown archeological evidence for the sacrifice of domesticated animals. Proto-Indo-Europeans also had a sacred tradition of horse sacrifice for the renewal of kinship involving the ritual mating of a queen or king with a horse, which was then sacrificed and cut up for distribution to the other participants in the ritual.

Although we know little about the role of magic in Proto-Indo-European society, there is no doubt that it existed as a social phenomenon, as several branches attest the use of similarly worded charms and curses, such as ones against worms. Furthermore, incantations and spells were frequently regarded as one of the three categories of medicine, along with the use of surgical instruments and herbs or drugs. Since the earliest evidence for the burning of the plant was found in Romanian kurgans dated 3,500 BCE, some scholars suggest that cannabis was first used as a psychoactive drug by Proto-Indo-Europeans during ritual ceremonies, a custom they eventually spread throughout western Eurasia during their migrations. Descendant cognates of the root *kanna- 'cannabis' have been proposed in Sanskrit śaná, Greek kánnabis (κάνναβις), Germanic *hanipa (German Hanf, English hemp), Russian konopljá, Albanian kanëp, Armenian kanap and Old Prussian knapios. Other linguists suggest that the common linguistic inheritance does not date back to the Indo-European period and contend that the word cannabis likely spread later across Eurasia as a Wanderwort ('wandering word'), ultimately borrowed into Ancient Greek and Sanskrit from a non-Indo-European language.

=== Poetry ===
Poetry and songs were central to Proto-Indo-European society. The poet-singer was the society's highest-paid professional, possibly a member of a hereditary profession that ran in certain families, the art passing from father to son as the poet had to acquire all the technical aspects of the art and to master an extensive body of traditional subject matter. He performed against handsome rewards—such as gifts of horses, cattle, wagons and women—and was held in high esteem. In some cases, the poet-singer had a stable relationship with a particular noble prince or family. In other cases, he travelled about with his dependants, attaching himself to one court after another.

A transmitter of inherited cultural knowledge, the poet sang as a recall of the old heroic times, entrusted with telling the praises of heroes, kings, and gods. Composing sacred hymns ensured the gods would in turn bestow favourable fate to the community, and for kings that their memory would live on many generations. A lexeme for a special song, the *erkw 'praise of the gift', has been identified in early Proto-Indo-European. Such praise poems proclaimed the generosity of the gods (or a patron) and enumerated their gifts, expanding the patron's fame, the path to immortality otherwise only attainable for mortals through conspicuous acts of war or piety.

The concept of fame (*ḱléwos) was central to Proto-Indo-European poetry and culture. Many poetic dictions built on this term can be reconstituted, including *ḱléwos wéru 'wide fame', *ḱléwos meǵh₂ 'great fame', *ḱléuesh₂ h₂nróm 'the famous deeds of men, heroes', or *dus-ḱlewes 'having bad repute'. Indo-European poetic tradition was probably oral-formulaic: stock formulas, such as the "imperishable fame" (*ḱléwos ń̥dʰgʷʰitom), the "swift horses" (*h₁ōḱéwes h₁éḱwōs), the "eternal life" (*h₂iu-gʷih₃), the metaphor of the "wheel of the sun" (*sh₂uens kʷekʷlos), or the epithet "man-killer" (*hₐnr̥-gʷhen), attached to Hektor and Rudra alike, were transmitted among poet-singers to fill out traditional verse-lines in epic song lyrics. The task of the Indo-European poet was to preserve over the generations the famous deeds of heroes. He would compose and retell poems based on old and sometimes obscure formulations, reconnecting the motifs with his own skills and improvisations. Poetry was therefore associated with the acts of "weaving words" (*wékʷos webh-) and "crafting speech" (*wékʷos teḱs-).

=== Warfare ===
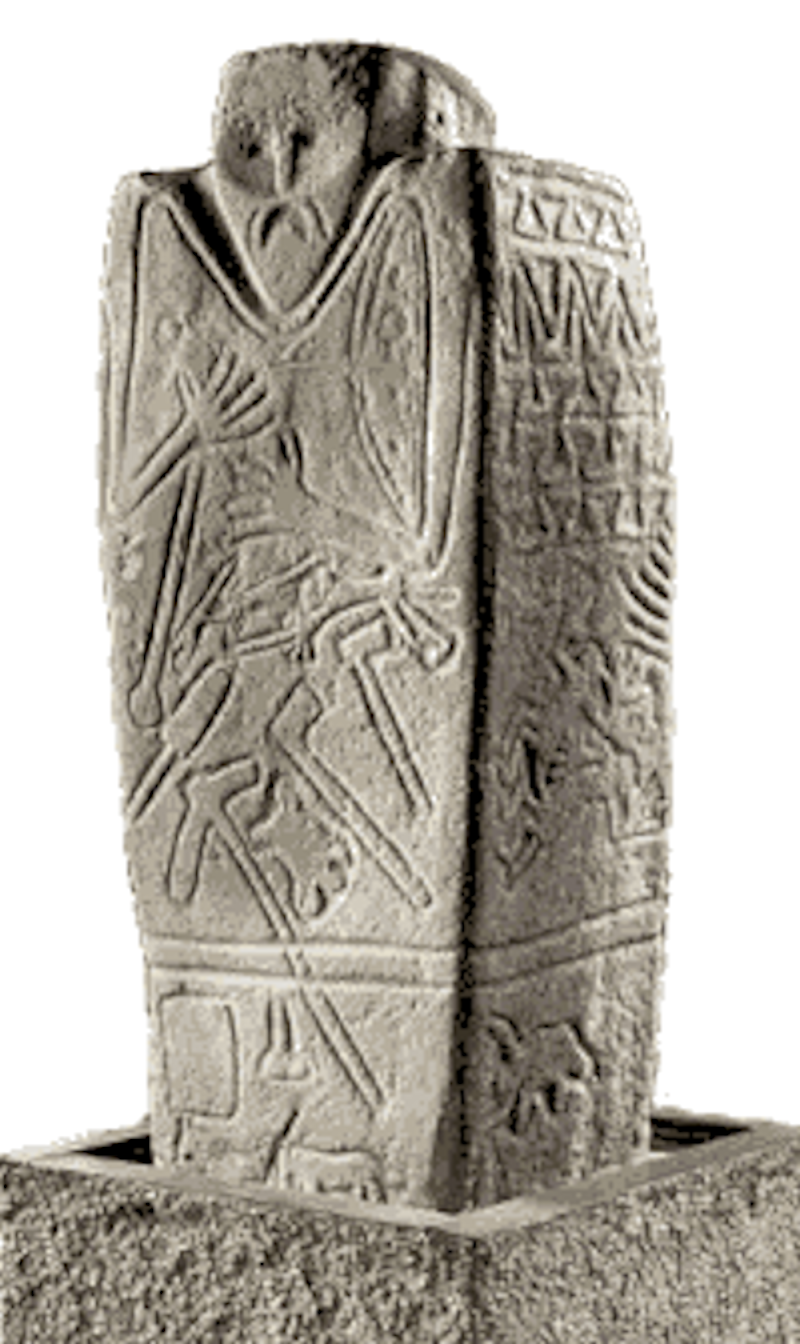
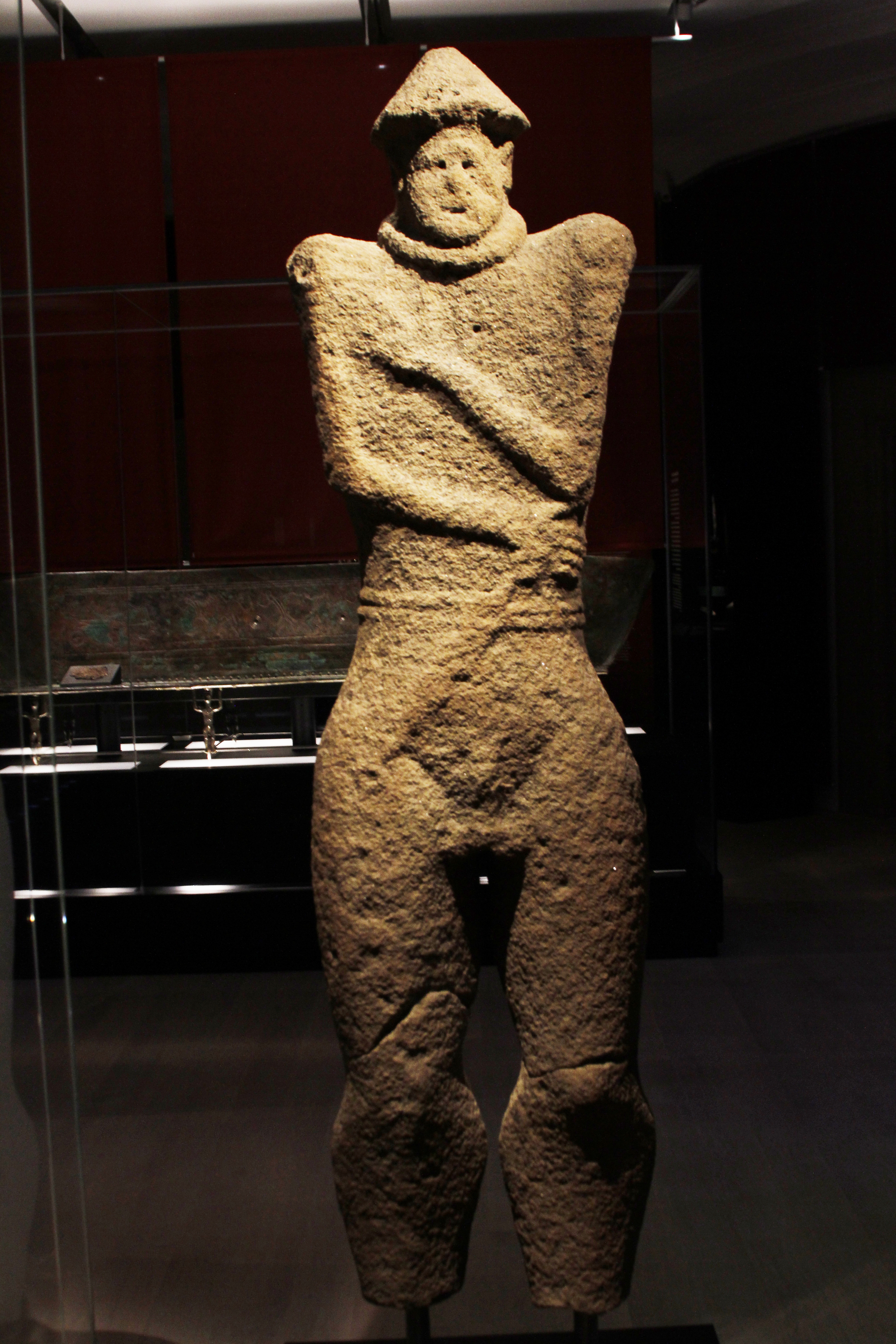
The Yamnaya Kernosovskiy idol, depicting a naked warrior with a belt, axes, and testicles (mid-3rd mill. BCE); and the Celtic Warrior of Hirschlanden (6th c. BCE), wearing only a helmet, neckband, belt, and sword.

Although Proto-Indo-Europeans have been often cast as warlike conquerors, their reconstructed arsenal is not particularly extensive. Several words with the meaning of "spear" (*gʷéru *ḱúh₁los), "pointed stick" (*h₂eiḱsmo) or "throwing spear" (*ǵʰai-só-s) are attested. The term *wēben meant a 'cutting weapon', probably a knife, and *h₂/₃n̩sis a 'large offensive knife', likely similar to bronze daggers found across Eurasia around 3300–3000 BCE. Proto-Indo-Europeans certainly did not know swords, which appeared later around 2000–1500. The axe was known as *h₄edʰés, while the word *spelo/eh₂ designated a wooden or leather shield. The term *leh₂wós meant 'military unit' or 'military action', while *teutéh₂- might have referred to the 'adult male with possession' who would mobilize during warfare, perhaps originally a Proto-Indo-European term meaning 'the people under arms'.

A number of scholars propose that Proto-Indo-European rituals included the requirement that young unmarried men initiate into manhood by joining a warrior-band named *kóryos. They were led by a senior male and lived off the country by hunting and engaging in raiding and pillaging foreign communities. Kóryos members served in such brotherhoods (Männerbünde) for a number of years before returning home to adopt more respectable identities as mature men. During their initiation period, the young males wore the skin and bore the names of wild animals, especially wolves (*wl̩kʷo) and dogs (*ḱwōn), in order to assume their nature and escape the rules and taboos of their host society.

Most kurgan stelae found in Pontic-Caspian steppe feature a man wearing a belt and weapons carved on the stone. In later Indo-European traditions, notably the (half-)naked warrior figures of Germanic and Celtic art, *kóryos raiders wore a belt that bound them to their leader and the gods, and little else. The tradition of kurgan stelae featuring warriors with a belt is also common in Scythian cultures. A continuity of an "animal-shaped raid culture" has been also postulated based on various elements attested in later Indo-European-speaking cultures, such as the Germanic Berserkers, the Italic Ver Sacrum, and the Spartan Crypteia, as well as in the mythical Celtic fianna and Vedic Maruts, and in the legend of the werewolf ("man-wolf"), found in Greek, Germanic, Baltic and Slavic traditions alike.

In a mostly patriarchal economy based on bride competition, the escalation of the bride-price in periods of climate change could have resulted in an increase in cattle raiding by unmarried men. Scholars also suggest that, alongside the attractiveness of the patron-client and the guest-host relationships, the *kóryos could have played a key role in diffusing Indo-European languages across most of Eurasia.

=== Personal names ===
The use of two-word compound words for personal names, typically but not always ascribing some noble or heroic feat to their bearer, is so common in Indo-European languages that it is certainly an inherited feature. These names often belonged in early dialects to the class of compound words that in the Sanskrit tradition are called bahuvrihi. As in Vedic bahuvrihi (lit. 'much-rice', meaning 'one who has much rice'), those compounds are formed as active structures indicating possession and do not require a verbal root. From the Proto-Indo-European personal name *H₁wésu-ḱléwos (lit. 'good-fame', meaning 'possessing good fame') derive the Liburnian Vescleves, the Greek Eukleḗs (Εὐκλεής), the Old Persian Huçavah, the Avestan Haosravah-, and the Sanskrit Suśráva.

A second type of compound consists of a noun followed by a verbal root or stem, describing an individual performing an action. Compounds more similar to synthetics are found in the Sanskrit Trasá-dasyus 'one who causes enemies to tremble', the Greek Archelaus (Ἀρχέλαος 'one who rules people'), and the Old Persian Xšayāršan 'one who rules men'.

Many Indo-European personal names are associated with the horse (*h₁éḱwos) in particular, which expressed both the wealth and nobility of their bearer, including the Avestan Hwaspa 'owning good horses', the Greek Hippónikos 'winning by his horses', or the Gaulish Epomeduos 'master of horses'. Since domestic animals also served to sacrifice, there were often used as exocentric structures in compound names (the bearers are not 'horses' themselves but 'users of horses' in some way), in contrast to endocentric personal names rather associated with wild animals like the wolf, for instance in the German Rudolf 'a famous wolf' or the Serbian Dobrovuk 'a good wolf'.

== Economy ==
Proto-Indo-Europeans possessed a Neolithic mixed economy based on livestock and subsidiary agriculture, with a wide range of economic regimes and various degrees of mobility that could be expected across the large Pontic-Caspian steppe. Tribes were typically more influenced by farming in the western Dnieper-Donets region, where cereal cultivation was practised, while the eastern Don-Volga steppes were inhabited by semi-nomadic and pastoral populations mostly relying on herding.

Proto-Indo-European distinguished between unmovable and movable wealth (*péḱu 'livestock'). As for the rest of society, economy was founded on reciprocity. A gift always entailed a counter-gift, and each party was bound to the other in a mutual relationship cemented by trust.

=== Trade ===
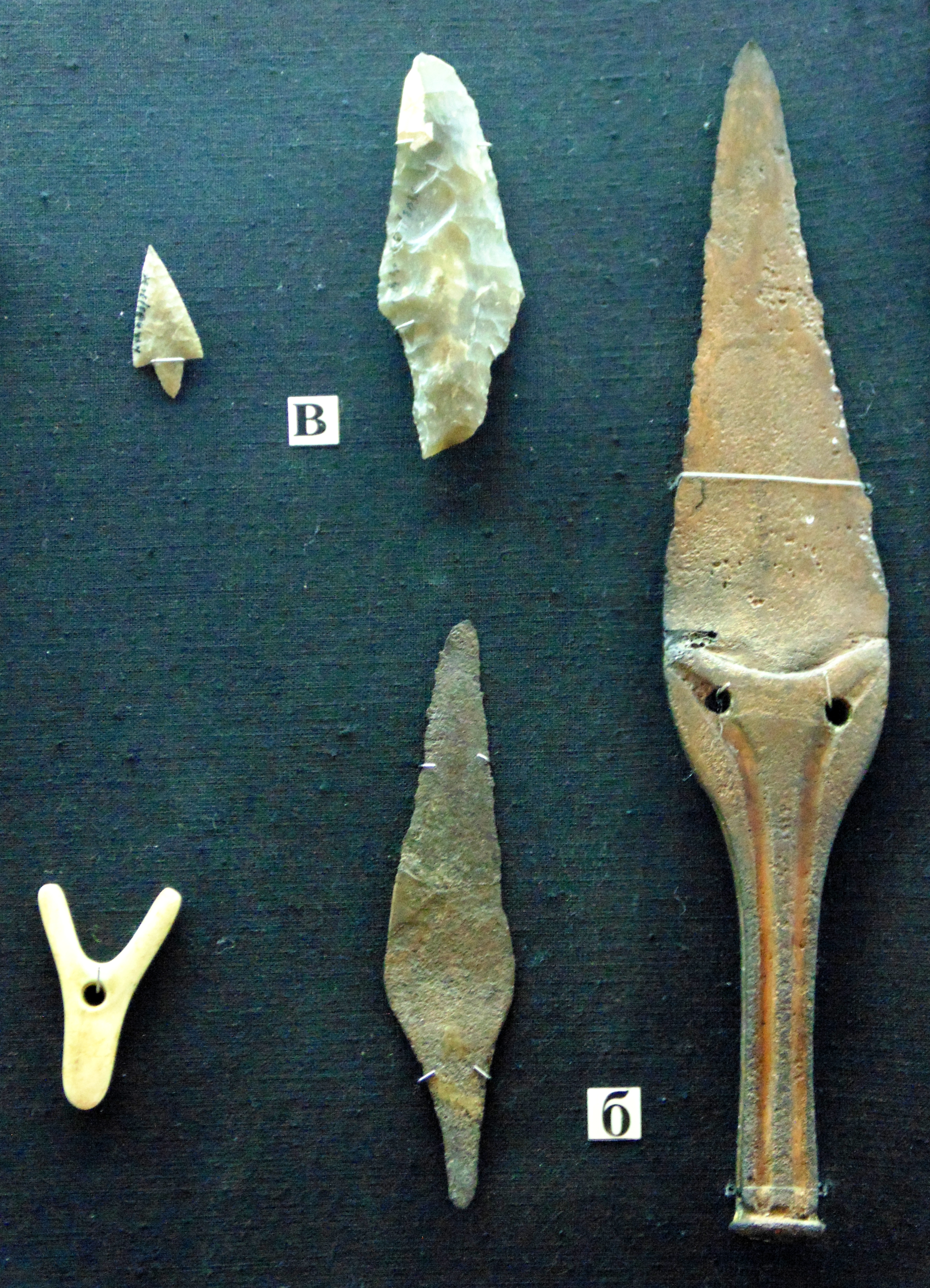
Yamnaya bone and bronze arrowheads.

The early Khvalynsk culture, located in the Volga-Ural steppes and associated with early Proto-Indo-European, had trade relationship with Old European cultures. Domesticated cattle, sheep and goats, as well as copper, were introduced eastward from the Danube valley around 4700–4500. Copper objects show an artistic influence from Old Europe, and the appearance of sacrificed animals suggest that a new set of rituals emerged following the introduction of herding from the west. The Old European Tripolye culture continued to influence the western part of the steppes, in the Dnieper-Donets region, where the Yamnaya culture was more agricultural and less male-centered.

Proto-Indo-European speakers also had indirect contacts with Uruk around 3700–3500 through the North Caucasian Maikop culture, a trade route that introduced the wheeled wagon into the Caspian-Pontic steppes. Wheel-made pottery imported from Mesopotamia were found in the Northern Caucasus, and Maikop chieftain was buried wearing Mesopotamian symbols of power—the lion paired with the bull. The late Khvalynsk and Repin cultures probably traded wool and domesticated horses in exchange, as suggested by the widespread appearance of horses in archeological sites across Transcaucasia after 3300. Socio-cultural interactions with Northwest Caucasians have been proposed, on the ground that the Proto-Indo-European language shows a number of lexical parallels with Proto-Northwest Caucasian. Proto-Indo-European also exhibits lexical loans to or from other Caucasian languages, particularly Proto-Kartvelian.

Proto-Indo-European probably also had trade relationships with Proto-Uralic speakers around the Ural Mountains. Words for "sell" and "wash" were borrowed in Proto-Uralic, and words for "price" and "draw, lead" were introduced in the Proto-Finno-Ugric language. James P. Mallory suggested that the expansion of the Uralic languages across the northern forest zone might have been stimulated by organizational changes within Uralic forager societies, resulting partly from interaction with more complex, hierarchical Proto-Indo-European and (later) Indo-Iranian pastoral societies at the steppe/forest-steppe ecological border.

=== Technology ===
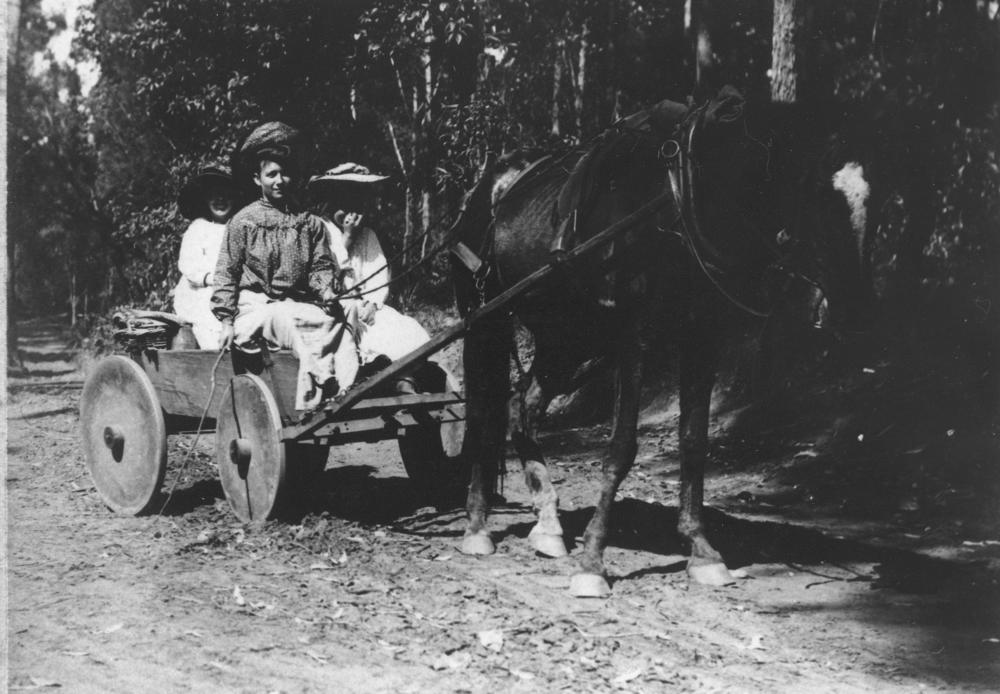
A horse-drawn, spoke-less, wheeled and wood-made wagon, close to what was used in the Pontic-Caspian steppe around 3500–2500 BC. Here in Queensland, 1900.

From the reconstructable lexicon, it is clear that Proto-Indo-Europeans were familiar with wheeled vehicles—certainly horse-drawn wagons (*weǵʰnos)—as they knew the wheel (*kʷekʷlóm), the axle (*h₂eḱs-), the shaft (*h₂/₃éih₁os), and the yoke (*yugóm). Although wheels were most likely not invented by Proto-Indo-Europeans, the word *kʷekʷlóm is a native derivation of the root *kʷel- 'to turn' rather than a borrowing, suggesting short contacts with the people who introduced the concept to them.

The technology used was a solid wheel made of three planks joined with their outer edges trimmed to a circle. The swift chariot with spoked wheels, which made the mode of transport much more rapid and lighter, appeared later within the Sintashta culture (2100–1800), associated with the Indo-Iranians. As the word for "boat" (*néh₂us) is widely attested across the language groups, the means of transport (likely a dugout canoe) was certainly known by Proto-Indo-Europeans.

The vocabulary associated with metallurgy is very restricted and at best we can attest the existence of copper/bronze, gold, and silver. The basic word for "metal" (*h₂ey-es) is generally presumed to mean "copper" or a copper-tin alloy of "bronze". "Gold" is reliably reconstructed as *h₂eusom, and *h₂erǵ-n̩t-om designated a "white metal" or "silver". Proto-Indo-Europeans were also familiar with the sickle (*sr̩po/eh₂), the awl (*h₁óleh₂) for working leather or drilling wood, and used a primitive plough (*h₂érh₃ye/o) made of a curved and forked branch.

The term for "oven" or "cooking vessel" (*h₂/₃ukʷ) has been reconstructed based on four branches, as for "baking" (*bʰōg-) and "boiling" (*yes-). They certainly drank beer (*h₂elut) and mead (*médʰu), and the word for "wine" (*wóinom) has been proposed, although this remains a debated issue. Proto-Indo-Europeans produced textile, as attested by the reconstructed roots for wool (*wĺh₂neh₂), flax (*linom), sewing (*syuh₁-), spinning (*(s)pen-), weaving (*h₂/₃webʰ-) and plaiting (*pleḱ-), as well as needle (*skʷēis) and thread (*pe/oth₂mo). They were also familiar with combs (*kes) and ointments with salve (*h₃engʷ-).

== Animals ==
Animals (mammals in particular) are fairly abundant in the reconstructed lexicon. We can ascribe about seventy-five names to various animal species, but it hardly recovers all the animals to have been distinguished in the proto-language. While *kʷetwor-pod designated a four-footed animal (tetrapod), *gʷyéh₃wyom seems to have been the general term for animals, derived from the root *gʷyeh₃- 'to live'. Proto-Indo-European speakers also made a distinction between wild animals (*ǵʰwḗr) and the livestock (*péḱu).

=== Domesticated animals ===
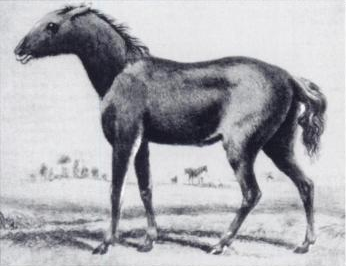
Tarpan horse (1841 drawing)

The reconstructed lexicon suggests a Neolithic economy with extensive references to domesticated animals. They were familiar with cows (*gʷṓus), sheep (*h₃ówis), goats (*díks or *h₂eiĝs) and pigs (*sūs; also *pórḱos 'piglet').

They knew dogs (*ḱwōn), milk (*ǵl̩ákt; also *h₂melǵ- 'to milk') and dairy foods, wool (*wĺh₂neh₂) and woollen textiles, agriculture, wagons, and honey (*mélit). The domestication of the horse (h₁éḱwos), thought to be an extinct Tarpan species, probably originated with these peoples, and scholars invoke this innovation as a factor contributing to their increased mobility and rapid expansion.

The dog was perceived as a symbol of death and depicted as the guardian of the Otherworld in Indo-European cultures (Greek Cerberus, Indic Śārvara, Norse Garmr). The mytheme possibly stems from an older Ancient North Eurasian belief, as evidenced by similar motifs in Native American and Siberian mythology, in which case it might be one of the oldest mythemes recoverable through comparative mythology. In various Indo-European traditions, the worst throw at the game of dice was named the "dog", and the best throw was known as the "dog-killer". Canine teeth of dogs were frequently worn as pendants in Yamnaya graves in the western Pontic steppes, particularly in the Ingul valley.

=== Wild animals ===
Linguistic evidence suggest that Proto-Indo-European speakers were also in contact with various wild animals, such as red foxes (*wl(o)p), wolves (*wl̩kʷo), bears (*h₂ŕ̩tḱos), red deer (*h₁elh₁ēn), elks (moose) (*h₁ólḱis), eagles (*h₃or), otters (*udrós), snakes (h₁ógʷʰis), mice (*mūs; from *mus- 'to steal'), or trouts (*lóḱs).

Some of them were featured in mythological and folkloric motifs. Goats draw the chariots of the Norse and Indic gods Thor and Pushan, and they are associated with the Baltic god Perkūnas and the Greek god Pan. The words for both the wolf and the bear underwent taboo deformation in a number of branches, suggesting that they were feared as symbols of death in Proto-Indo-European culture.

In Indo-European culture, the term "wolf" is generally applied to brigands and outlaws who live in the wild. Ritual and mythological concepts connected with wolves, in some cases similar with Native American beliefs, may represent a common Ancient North Eurasian heritage: mai-coh meant both 'wolf' and 'witch' among Navajos, and shunk manita tanka a 'doglike powerful spirit' among Očhéthi Šakówiŋ, while the Proto-Indo-European root *ṷeid 'knowledge, clairvoyance' designated the wolf in both Hittite (ṷetna) and Old Norse (witnir), and a "werewolf" in Slavic languages (Serbian vjedogonja and vukodlak, Slovenian vedanec, Ukrainian viščun).

== See also ==
- Proto-Indo-Europeans
- Proto-Indo-European homeland
- Proto-Indo-European language
- Proto-Indo-European mythology
- Khvalynsk culture
- Yamnaya horizon
