= Suvorovo culture =

Eurasian Copper Age culture

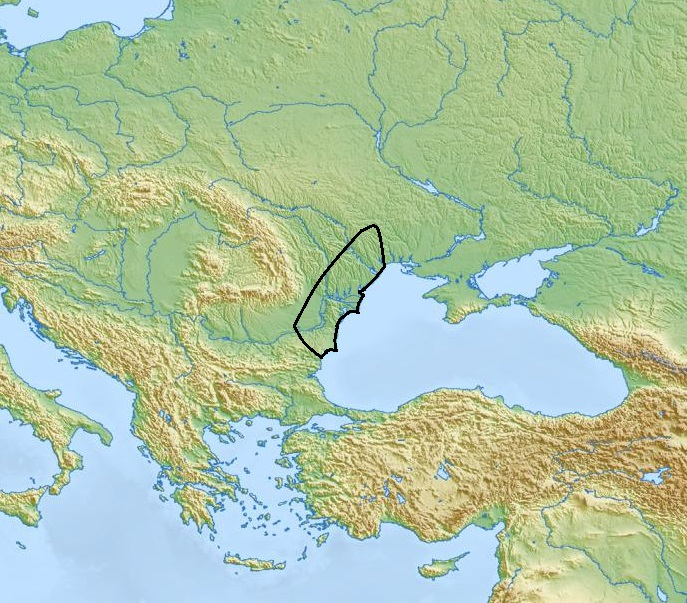
- Geographical range: Northwest Pontic steppe and the lower Danube, territories of present day Bulgaria, Romania, Moldova and Ukraine
- Period: Copper Age
- Dates: ca. 4400–4000 BC
- Preceded by: Sredny Stog culture
- Followed by: Cernavodă culture

The Suvorovo (Suvorove in Ukrainian) culture, part of the Suvorovo–Novodanilovka group, was a Copper Age culture which flourished on the northwest Pontic steppe and the lower Danube from 4400 BC to 4000 BC.

The Suvorovo culture is entirely defined by its burials. These include kurgans and flat graves. Burials are oriented towards the east or northeast, in a supine position with legs either flexed or extended. Roofs of the burial chambers are often covered with stone slabs or logs.

At the eponymic Suvorove kurgan cemetery, a burial of a male and female in a joint grave was found (Suvorove II, kurgan 1, Burial 7).

Burial 7 was the main one in one of two small mounds surrounded by double cromlechs, 5.56 m in diameter, touching on the outer sides and located at the base of a large mound. The large circle was a cromlech, made up of massive slabs placed on edge. The diameter of the large cromlech is 13 m. The dimensions of the larger slabs were 0.85 x 0.65 x 0.25 m and 1 x 0.7 x 03 m. The smaller ones were lined with small unworked stones. They were built according to a single building principle, they were found at the same depth, which indicates their simultaneity.

Burial 7 was located in a rectangular, slightly trapezoidal pit, measuring 1.7 x 4 x 2 x 0.4 m. At the bottom of the pit, two skeletons were found with their heads to the east. The first skeleton, likely a male, was laid on his back with arms stretched out along the torso and legs bent in a rhombus. To the left of the skull, a piece of coal with traces of ocher was found. Near the right clavicle, a flint knife-like plate 12 cm long, a round copper awl, 0.2 cm in diameter and 12.5 cm long, as well as a smaller flint knife-like plate were found. A stone scepter in the form of a horse's head made of polished stone was found on the pelvic bones.

The second skeleton, likely a female, was laid on the back and turned to the right side and facing the first skeleton, with legs slightly bent. The arms were slightly bent at the elbows, the left hand resting on the pelvic bones, next to it is a flint knife-like plate and a copper awl of smaller sizes compared to those found with the first skeleton. The right hand was directed to the left hand of the first skeleton. Next to it, a combined tool in the form of a flint end scraper with retouching extending to the edges was found. The tool had traces of being exposed to fire. On the pelvic bones of the second skeleton, remains of a belt made of pendants carved from the valves of Unio shells were found, and on the neck vertebrae there were beads made of the same smaller pendants.

Archaeologically, Suvorovo is synchronous with the Skelya phase of the Sredny Stog culture and is considered to be part of the Suvorovo–Novodanilovka group.

Typical grave goods of the Suvorovo culture include ceramics both the Gumelnița–Karanovo culture and the Cucuteni–Trypillia culture, and shell-tempered wares that are typical of the steppe.

The Suvorovo kurgans are the earliest ones to appear in Southeast Europe. Its features are characteristic of cultures on the steppes and forest-steppes further east in Ukraine and southern Russia.

In accordance with the Kurgan hypothesis, the Suvorovo culture is evidence of a westward expansion of early Indo-European peoples (proto-Hittites) from their homeland on the steppe. The next major step on their way to Anatolia is known as the Ezero culture.

== Gallery ==
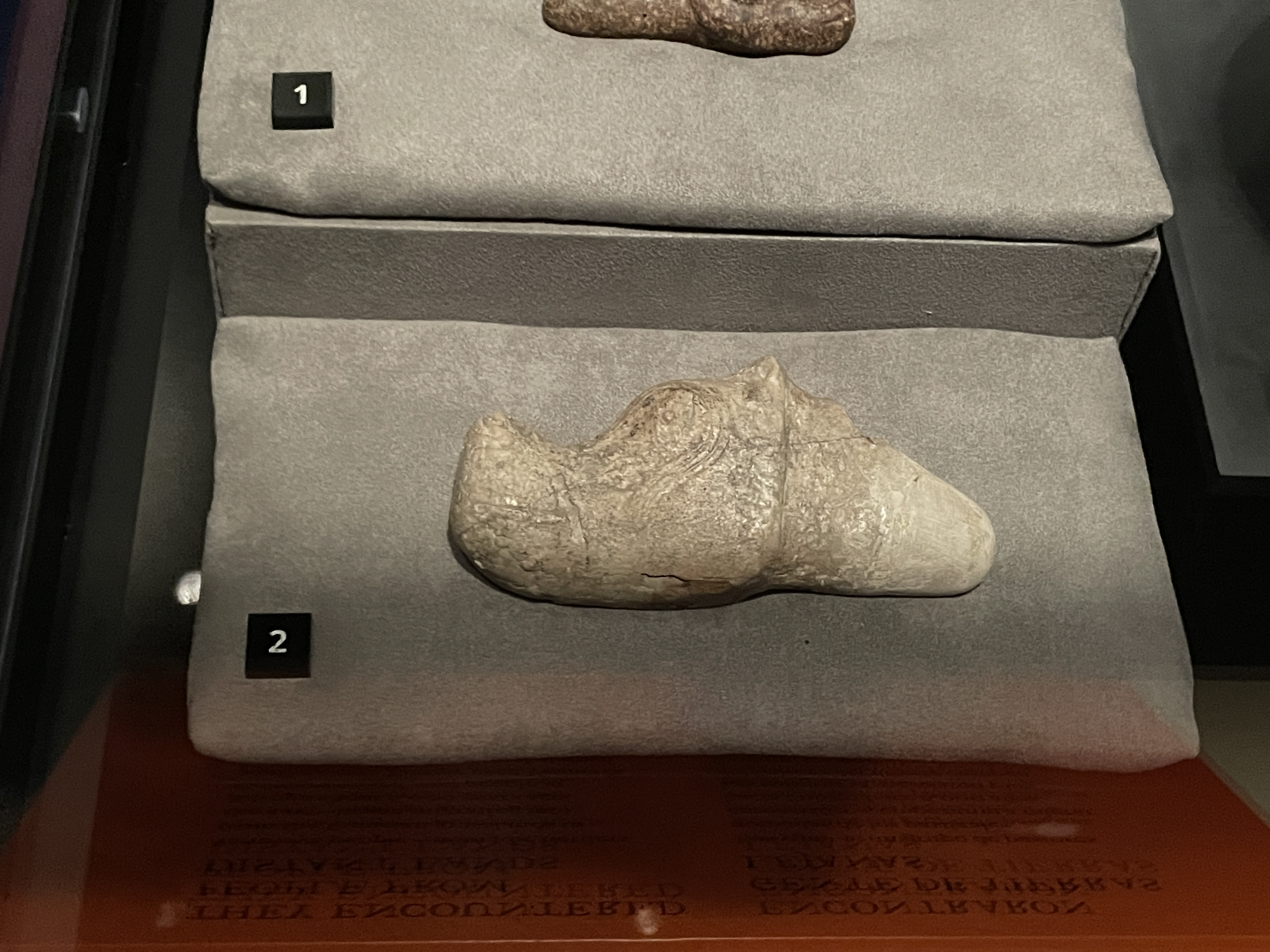
Horse-head sceptre from Casimçea, Romania

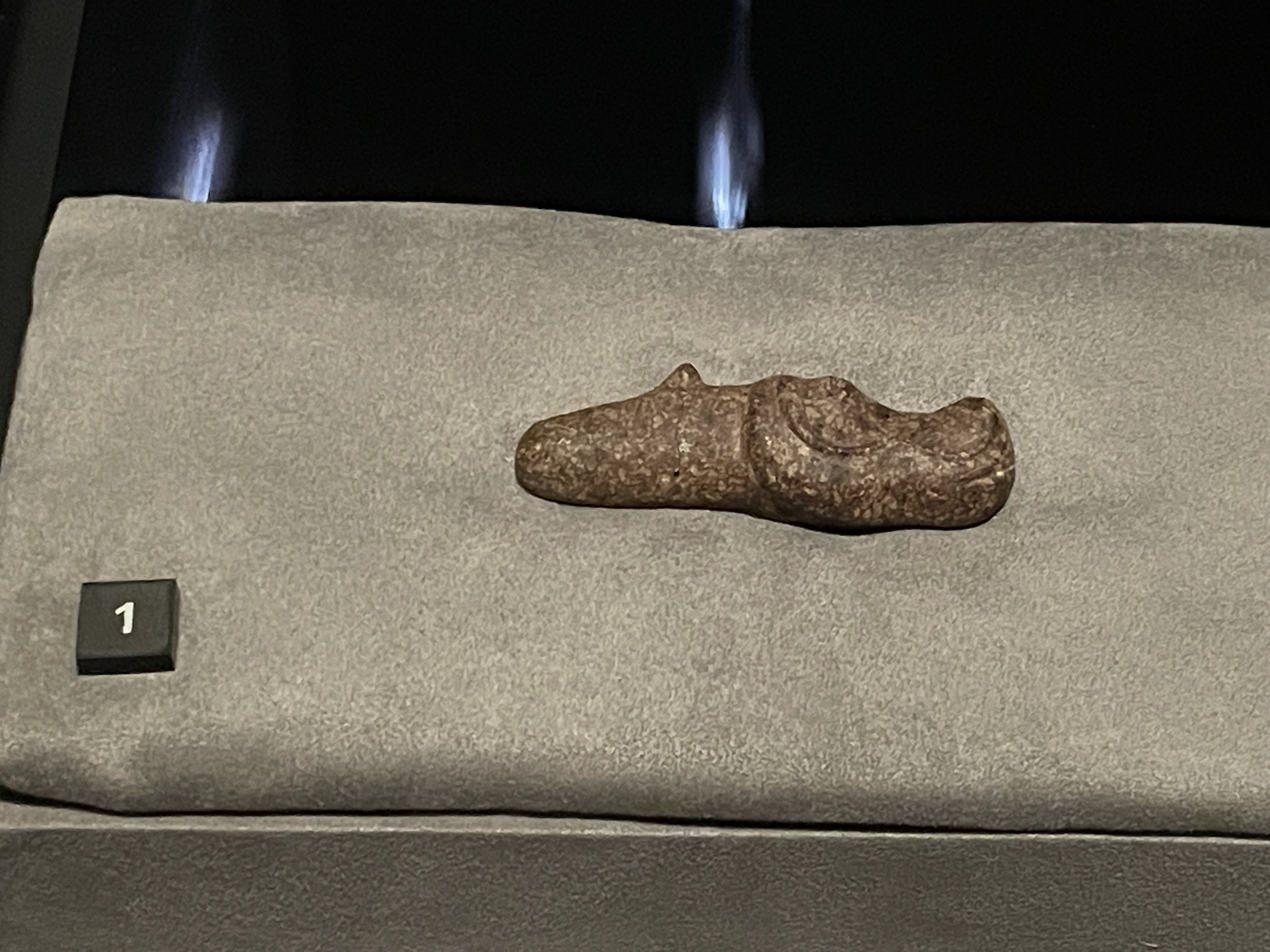
Horse-head sceptre from Šuplevec, North Macedonia

== See also ==
- Sredny Stog culture
- Yamnaya culture
- Usatovo culture
- Novodanilovka group
- Old Europe (archaeology)

== Sources ==
- Mallory, J. P.; Adams, Douglas Q. (1997). "Suvorovo culture". Encyclopedia of Indo-European Culture. Taylor & Francis. pp. 556–557. ISBN 1884964982.
