= Mariupol culture =

Neolithic culture in southern Russia and Ukraine

Coordinates: 47.1086°N 37.6106°E

The Mariupol culture (Mariupol-type cemeteries) was a transitional culture of the Neolithic and Eneolithic (Copper Age) in the Pontic Steppe during the second half of the 5th millennium BCE. The final stages of this culture are described as the Post-Mariupol culture. The Post-Mariupol culture was superseded by Sredny Stog culture. In older works, it is referred to as a part of wider Dnieper-Donets culture also known as the Mariupol type cultures.

During the building of the Azovstal Iron and Steel Works in 1930, Mykola Makarenko unearthed a burial site on the bank of the Kalmius river. The site was naturally raised over surrounding marshlands and had signs of ochre painting. Makarenko uncovered 122 human remains in what seemed to be one trench used as community grave, where younger bodies were added to the older ones with respect. The position of the bodies was extended supine with a southeast or northwest orientation. The Mariupol cemetery contained numerous stone tools including microliths, flint axes, bone beads, necklaces of animal teeth, boar-tusks, bone tutuli and other objects of bone. There was almost no pottery, though.

In addition to the name site mentioned above, similar sites include Vasylivka, Deriivka I, Vovnihy (on the Dnieper), Dolynka (Crimea), Staronizhesteblievskaya (Kuban Region) and many others. The identity of these sites is disputed, with some scholars assigning them to the Dnieper-Donets, Azov-Dnieper or the Lower Don culture.

D. Ya. Telegin, an expert on Neolithic and Eneolithic Eastern Europe, asserts that the Mariupol-type cemeteries seem to have had their origins in the late Mesolithic and endured into the Copper Age: a period of more than two thousand years (c. 6500–4000 cal BC). They were primarily fisher-hunter-gatherers familiar with livestock through exchange or pastoralism. In terms of biological anthropology, Mariupol remains appear to be Caucasoid and physically larger than their contemporaries.

== See also ==
- Domestication of the horse
