= Steppe theory =

Theory of Indo-European origin

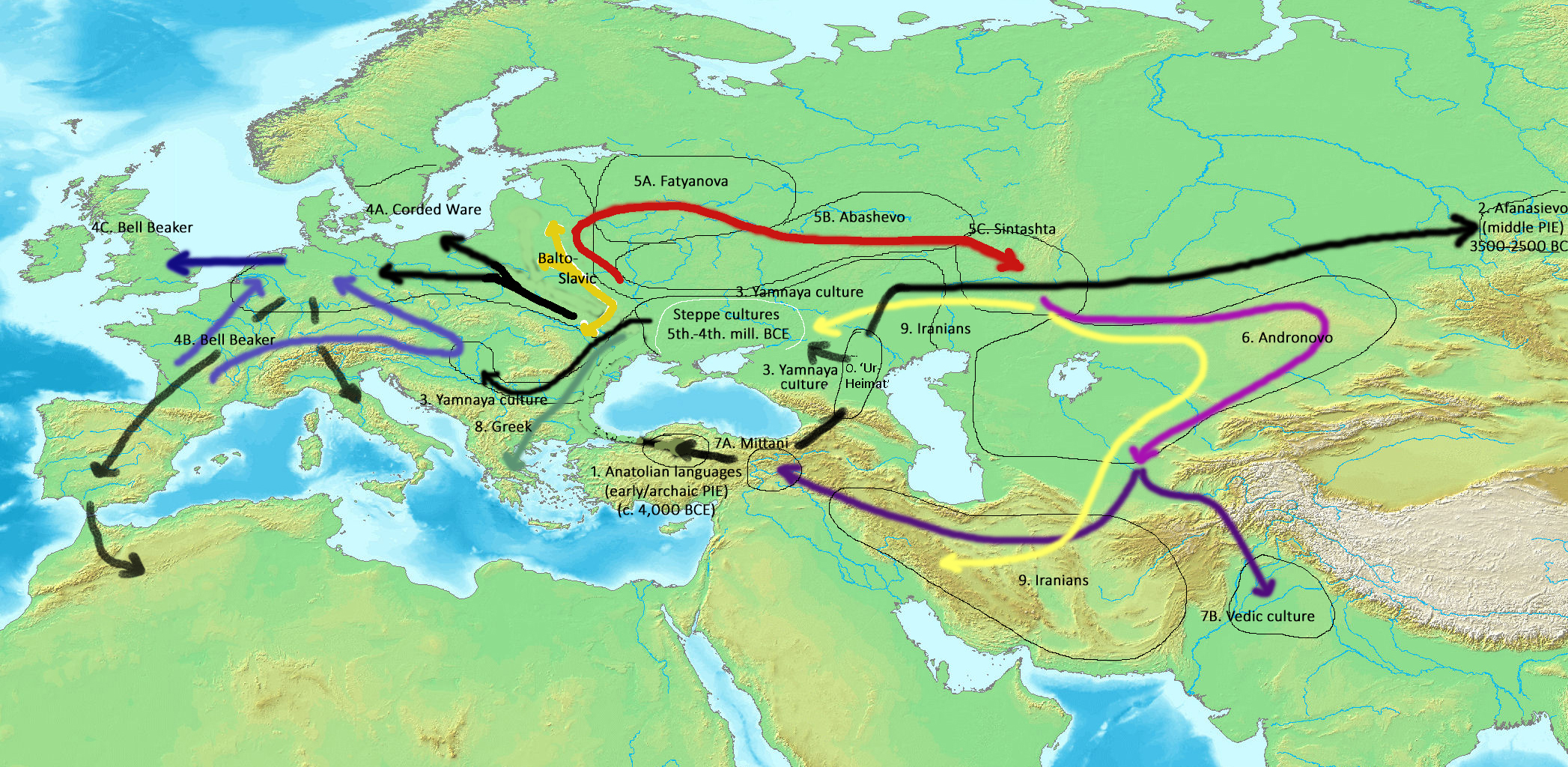
Scheme of Indo-European language dispersals from c. 4000 to 1000 BC according to the Steppe theory. Center: Steppe cultures 1: Anatolian languages (archaic PIE) 2: Afanasievo culture (early PIE) 3: Yamnaya culture expansion (Pontic-Caspian steppe, Danube Valley) (late PIE) 4A: Western Corded Ware 4B: Bell Beaker culture (adopted by Indo-European speakers) 4C: Bell Beaker 5A-B: Eastern Corded ware; 5C: Sintashta culture (proto-Indo-Iranian) 6: Andronovo 7: Indo-Aryans (A: Mittani; B: India) 8: Greek 9: Iranian Proto-Balto-Slavic Not shown: Armenian, expanding from western steppe

The steppe theory, also known as archaeologist Marija Gimbutas's Kurgan hypothesis, Kurgan theory, and Kurgan model, is the most widely accepted proposal to identify the Proto-Indo-European homeland from which the Indo-European languages spread out throughout Europe and parts of Asia. It postulates that the people of a Kurgan culture in the Pontic steppe north of the Black Sea were the most likely speakers of the Proto-Indo-European language (PIE). The term is derived from the Turkic word kurgan (курга́н), meaning tumulus or burial mound.

The steppe theory was first formulated by Otto Schrader (1883) and V. Gordon Childe (1926), then systematized in the 1950s by Marija Gimbutas in her Kurgan model, who used the term to group various prehistoric cultures, including the Yamnaya (or Pit Grave) culture and its predecessors. In the 2000s, David Anthony instead used the core Yamnaya culture and its relationship with other cultures as a point of reference.

Gimbutas defined the Kurgan culture as composed of four successive periods, with the earliest (Kurgan I) including the Samara and Seroglazovka cultures of the Dnieper–Volga region in the Copper Age (early 4th millennium BC). The people of these cultures were nomadic pastoralists, who, according to the model, by the early 3rd millennium BC had expanded throughout the Pontic–Caspian steppe and into Eastern Europe.

Genetics studies in the 21st century have demonstrated that populations bearing specific Y-DNA haplogroups and a distinct genetic signature expanded into Europe and South Asia from the Pontic-Caspian steppe during the third and second millennia BC. These migrations provide a plausible explanation for the spread of at least some of the Indo-European languages, and suggest that the alternative theories such as the Anatolian hypothesis, which places the Proto-Indo-European homeland in Neolithic Anatolia, are less likely to be correct.

== History ==
=== Predecessors ===
Arguments for the identification of the Proto-Indo-Europeans as steppe nomads from the Pontic–Caspian region had already been made in the 19th century by the German scholars Theodor Benfey (1869) and Victor Hehn (1870), followed notably by Otto Schrader (1883, 1890). Theodor Poesche had proposed the nearby Pinsk Marshes. In his standard work about PIE and to a greater extent in a later abbreviated version, Karl Brugmann took the view that the linguistic homeland could not be identified exactly by the scholarship of his time, but he tended toward Schrader's view. However, after Karl Penka's 1883 rejection of non-European PIE origins, most scholars favoured a Northern European origin.

The view of a Pontic origin was still strongly supported, including by the archaeologists V. Gordon Childe and Ernst Wahle. One of Wahle's students was Jonas Puzinas, who became one of Marija Gimbutas's teachers. Gimbutas, who acknowledged Schrader as a precursor, painstakingly marshalled a wealth of archaeological evidence from the territory of the Soviet Union and the Eastern Bloc that was not readily available to Western scholars, revealing a fuller picture of prehistoric Europe.

=== Overview ===
When it was first proposed in 1956, in The Prehistory of Eastern Europe, Part 1, Gimbutas's contribution to the search for Indo-European origins was an interdisciplinary synthesis of archaeology and linguistics. The Kurgan model of Indo-European origins identifies the Pontic–Caspian steppe as the Proto-Indo-European (PIE) homeland, and a variety of late PIE dialects are assumed to have been spoken across this region. According to this model, the Kurgan culture gradually expanded to the entire Pontic–Caspian steppe, Kurgan IV being identified with the Yamnaya culture of around 3000 BC.

The mobility of the Kurgan culture facilitated its expansion over the entire region and is attributed to the domestication of the horse followed by the use of early chariots. (Note: Parpola in Blench & Spriggs 1999, p. 181. "The history of the Indo-European words for 'horse' shows that the Proto-Indo-European speakers had long lived in an area where the horse was native and / or domesticated.(Mallory 1989, pp. 161–163). The first strong archaeological evidence for the domestication of the horse comes from the Ukrainian Srednij Stog culture, which flourished c. 4200–3500 BC and is likely to represent an early phase of the Proto-Indo-European culture (Anthony 1986, pp. 295f.; Mallory 1989, pp. 162, 197–210). During the Pit Grave culture (c. 3500–2800 BCE), which continued the cultures related to Srednij Stog and probably represents the late phase of the Proto-Indo-European culture – full-scale pastoral technology, including the domesticated horse, wheeled vehicles, stock breeding and limited horticulture, spread all over the Pontic steppes, and, c. 3000 BCE, in practically every direction from that centre (Anthony 1986; Anthony 1991; Mallory 1989, vol. 1).) The first strong archaeological evidence for the domestication of the horse comes from the Sredny Stog culture north of the Azov Sea in Ukraine, and would correspond to an early PIE or pre-PIE nucleus of the 5th millennium BC. Later genetic research has revised this picture. A 2021 study of ancient horse genomes found that modern domestic horses descend from a population of the Western Eurasian steppes, especially the lower Volga–Don region, which spread across Eurasia from about 2000 BC, and that the earlier domestic horses of the Botai culture were not their ancestors. The study rejected the common association of horseback riding with the Yamnaya expansion into Europe around 3000 BC, and linked the spread of these horses in Asia with chariots and Indo-Iranian languages after the Sintashta culture of the early second millennium BC. Subsequent expansion beyond the steppes led to hybrid, or in Gimbutas's terms "kurganized" cultures, such as the Globular Amphora culture to the west. From these kurganized cultures came the immigration of Proto-Greeks to the Balkans and the nomadic Indo-Iranian cultures to the east around 2500 BC.

== Gimbutas' Kurgan culture ==
=== Cultural horizon ===
Marija Gimbutas defined and introduced the term "Kurgan culture" in 1956 with the intention of introducing a "broader term" that would combine Sredny Stog II, Pit Grave (Yamnaya), and Corded Ware horizons (spanning the 4th to 3rd millennia in much of Eastern and Northern Europe). (Note: Gimbutas 1970, p. 156: "The name Kurgan culture (the Barrow culture) was introduced by the author in 1956 as a broader term to replace [something] and Pit-Grave (Russian Yamnaya), names used by Soviet scholars for the culture in the eastern Ukraine and south Russia, and Corded Ware, Battle-Axe, Ochre-Grave, Single-Grave and other names given to complexes characterized by elements of Kurgan appearance that formed in various parts of Europe".) The Kurgan archaeological culture or cultural horizon comprises the various cultures of the Pontic–Caspian steppe in the Copper Age to Early Bronze Age (5th to 3rd millennia BC), identified by similar artifacts and structures, but subject to inevitable imprecision and uncertainty. The eponymous kurgans (mound graves) are only one among several common features.

Cultures that Gimbutas considered as part of the "Kurgan culture":

- Bug–Dniester (6th millennium)
- Samara (5th millennium)
- Khvalynsk (5th millennium)
- Dnieper–Donets (5th to 4th millennia)
- Sredny Stog (mid-5th to mid-4th millennia)
- Maykop–Deriivka (mid-4th to mid-3rd millennia)
- Yamnaya (Pit Grave): This is itself a varied cultural horizon, spanning the entire Pontic–Caspian steppe from the mid-4th to the 3rd millennium.
- Usatove (late 4th millennium)

=== Stages of culture and expansion ===
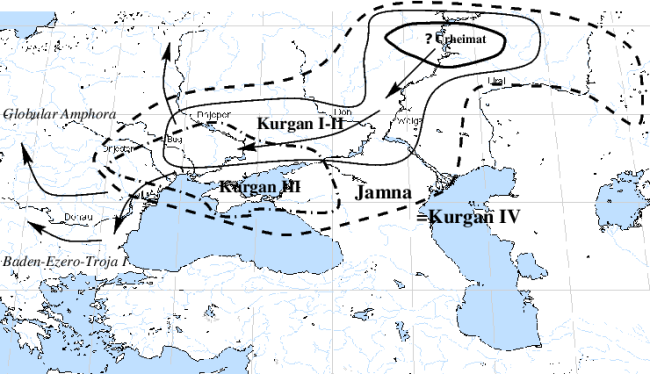
Overview of the Kurgan hypothesis

Gimbutas's original suggestion identifies four successive stages of the Kurgan culture:

- Kurgan I, Dnieper/Volga region, earlier half of the 4th millennium BC. Apparently evolving from cultures of the Volga basin, subgroups include the Samara and Seroglazovo cultures.
- Kurgan II–III, latter half of the 4th millennium BC. Stone circles, anthropomorphic stone stelae of deities. Includes the Sredny Stog culture and the Maykop culture of the northern Caucasus.
- Kurgan IV or Pit Grave (Yamnaya) culture, first half of the 3rd millennium BC, encompassing the entire steppe region from the Ural to Romania.

In other publications she proposes three successive "waves" of expansion:

- Wave 1, predating Kurgan I, expansion from the lower Volga to the Dnieper, leading to coexistence of Kurgan I and the Cucuteni–Trypillia culture. Repercussions of the migrations extend as far as the Balkans and along the Danube to the Vinča culture in Serbia and Lengyel culture in Hungary.
- Wave 2, mid 4th millennium BC, originating in the Maykop culture and resulting in advances of "kurganized" hybrid cultures into northern Europe around 3000 BC (Globular Amphora culture, Baden culture, and ultimately Corded Ware culture). According to Gimbutas this corresponds to the first intrusion of Indo-European languages into western and northern Europe.
- Wave 3, 3000–2800 BC, expansion of the Pit Grave culture beyond the steppes, with the appearance of the characteristic pit graves as far as modern Romania, Bulgaria, eastern Hungary and Georgia, coincident with the end of the Cucuteni–Trypillia culture and Trialeti culture in Georgia (c. 2750 BC).

=== Timeline ===
- 4500–4000: Early PIE. Sredny Stog, Dnieper–Donets and Samara cultures, domestication of the horse (Wave 1).
- 4000–3500: The Pit Grave culture (a.k.a. Yamnaya culture), the prototypical kurgan builders, emerges in the steppe, and the Maykop culture in the northern Caucasus. Indo-Hittite models postulate the separation of Proto-Anatolian before this time.
- 3500–3000: Middle PIE. The Pit Grave culture is at its peak, representing the classical reconstructed Proto-Indo-European society with stone idols, predominantly practicing animal husbandry in permanent settlements protected by hillforts, subsisting on agriculture, and fishing along rivers. Contact of the Pit Grave culture with late Neolithic Europe cultures results in the "kurganized" Globular Amphora and Baden cultures (Wave 2). The Maykop culture shows the earliest evidence of the beginning Bronze Age, and Bronze weapons and artifacts are introduced to Pit Grave territory. Probable early Satemization.
- 3000–2500: Late PIE. The Pit Grave culture extends over the entire Pontic steppe (Wave 3). The Corded Ware culture extends from the Rhine to the Volga, corresponding to the latest phase of Indo-European unity, the vast "kurganized" area disintegrating into various independent languages and cultures, still in loose contact enabling the spread of technology and early loans between the groups, except for the Anatolian and Tocharian branches, which are already isolated from these processes. The centum–satem break is probably complete, but the phonetic trends of Satemization remain active.

=== Further expansion during the Bronze Age ===
The Kurgan hypothesis describes the initial spread of Proto-Indo-European during the 5th and 4th millennia BC. As used by Gimbutas, the term "kurganized" implied that the culture could have been spread by no more than small bands who imposed themselves on local people as an elite. This idea of PIE and its daughter languages diffusing east and west without mass movement proved popular with archaeologists in the 1970s (the pots-not-people paradigm). The question of further Indo-Europeanization of Central and Western Europe, Central Asia and Northern India during the Bronze Age is beyond the scope of the Kurgan hypothesis, and far more uncertain than the events of the Copper Age, and subject to some controversy. The rapidly developing fields of archaeogenetics and genetic genealogy since the late 1990s have not only confirmed a migratory pattern out of the Pontic Steppe at the relevant time but also suggest the possibility that the population movement involved was more substantial than earlier anticipated and invasive.

== Revisions ==
=== Invasion versus diffusion scenarios (1980s onward) ===
Gimbutas believed that the expansions of the Kurgan culture were a series of essentially-hostile military incursions in which a new warrior culture imposed itself on the peaceful, matrilinear, and matrifocal (but not matriarchal) cultures of "Old Europe" and replaced it with a patriarchal warrior society, a process visible in the appearance of fortified settlements and hillforts and the graves of warrior-chieftains:

The process of Indo-Europeanization was a cultural, not a physical, transformation. It must be understood as a military victory in terms of successfully imposing a new administrative system, language, and religion upon the indigenous groups.

In her later life, Gimbutas increasingly emphasized the authoritarian nature of this transition from the egalitarian society centered on the nature/earth mother goddess (Gaia) to a patriarchy worshipping the father/sun/weather god (Zeus, Dyaus).

J. P. Mallory (in 1989) accepted the Kurgan hypothesis as the de facto standard theory of Indo-European origins, but he distinguished it from an implied "radical" scenario of military invasion. Gimbutas' actual main scenario involved slow accumulation of influence through coercion or extortion, as distinguished from general raiding shortly followed by conquest:

One might at first imagine that the economy of argument involved with the Kurgan solution should oblige us to accept it outright. But critics do exist and their objections can be summarized quite simply: Almost all of the arguments for invasion and cultural transformations are far better explained without reference to Kurgan expansions, and most of the evidence so far presented is either totally contradicted by other evidence, or is the result of gross misinterpretation of the cultural history of Eastern, Central, and Northern Europe.

=== Alignment with Anatolian hypothesis (2000s) ===
In the 2000s, Alberto Piazza and Luigi Luca Cavalli-Sforza tried to align the Anatolian hypothesis with the steppe theory. According to Piazza, "[i]t is clear that, genetically speaking, peoples of the Kurgan steppe descended at least in part from people of the Middle Eastern Neolithic who immigrated there from Anatolia." According to Piazza and Cavalli-Sforza (2006), the Yamna-culture may have been derived from Middle Eastern Neolithic farmers who migrated to the Pontic steppe and developed pastoral nomadism. (Note: Piazza & Cavalli-Sforza 2006: "...if the expansions began at 9,500 years ago from Anatolia and at 6,000 years ago from the Yamnaya culture region, then a 3,500-year period elapsed during their migration to the Volga-Don region from Anatolia, probably through the Balkans. There a completely new, mostly pastoral culture developed under the stimulus of an environment unfavorable to standard agriculture, but offering new attractive possibilities. Our hypothesis is, therefore, that Indo-European languages derived from a secondary expansion from the Yamnaya culture region after the Neolithic farmers, possibly coming from Anatolia and settled there, developing pastoral nomadism.) Wells agrees with Cavalli-Sforza that there is "some genetic evidence for migration from the Middle East." (Note: Wells & Read 2002, p.: "... while we see substantial genetic and archaeological evidence for an Indo-European migration originating in the southern Russian steppes, there is little evidence for a similarly massive Indo-European migration from the Middle East to Europe. One possibility is that, as a much earlier migration (8,000 years old, as opposed to 4,000), the genetic signals carried by Indo-European-speaking farmers may simply have dispersed over the years. There is clearly some genetic evidence for migration from the Middle East, as Cavalli-Sforza and his colleagues showed, but the signal is not strong enough for us to trace the distribution of Neolithic languages throughout the entirety of Indo-European-speaking Europe.") Nevertheless, the Anatolian hypothesis is generally considered incompatible with the linguistic evidence.

=== Anthony's revised steppe theory (2007) ===
David Anthony's The Horse, the Wheel and Language describes his "revised steppe theory". He considers the term "Kurgan culture" so imprecise as to be useless, and instead uses the core Yamnaya culture and its relationship with other cultures as points of reference. He points out:

The Kurgan culture was so broadly defined that almost any culture with burial mounds, or even (like the Baden culture) without them could be included.

He does not include the Maykop culture among those that he considers to be Indo-European-speaking and presumes instead that they spoke a Caucasian language.

In a 2013 article Anthony argued that the first three splits in the Indo-European family, those of Anatolian, Tocharian and a group including Italic, Celtic and perhaps Germanic, corresponded to three migrations out of the Pontic–Caspian steppes, dated about 4400–4200 BC, 3300–2800 BC and 3000–2800 BC. He linked the first to the abandonment and burning of hundreds of tell settlements in the lower Danube valley and eastern Bulgaria, the second to the Afanasievo culture, and the third to a Yamnaya movement into the Danube valley.

In a 2013 assessment J. P. Mallory described the Pontic–Caspian model, developed by Gimbutas and most extensively by Anthony, as placing the homeland in the steppe and forest-steppe between the Dnieper and the Volga around 4500–3000 BC. He noted that it accounts for the early separation of Anatolian from the other branches. He also listed problems for it, among them the lack of serious evidence for arable agriculture east of the Dnieper before about 2000 BC, and concluded that each of the three main homeland models had serious deficiencies.

== See also ==
- Hamangia culture
- Varna culture
- Animal sacrifice
- Ashvamedha
- Shaft tomb
- Revised Kurgan theory
- Germanic substrate hypothesis

Genetics

- Archaeogenetics of Europe
- Haplogroup R1a
- Lactase persistence

Competing hypotheses

- Proto-Indo-European Urheimat hypotheses
  - Armenian hypothesis
  - Anatolian hypothesis
  - Out of India theory
  - Paleolithic continuity theory

== Bibliography ==
- Anthony, David W (1991). "The Archaeology of Indo-European Origins". The Archaeology of Indo-European Origins. 19 (3–4): 193–222. ISSN 0092-2323.
- Anthony, David W. (2007). The Horse, The Wheel, and Language: How Bronze-Age Riders from the Eurasian Steppes Shaped the Modern World. Princeton University Press. ISBN 978-0-691-05887-0.
- Anthony, David W.; Bogucki, Peter; Comşa, Eugen; Gimbutas, Marija; Jovanović, Borislav; Mallory, J. P.; Milisaukas, Sarunas (1986). "The "Kurgan Culture," Indo-European Origins, and the Domestication of the Horse: A Reconsideration". Current Anthropology. 27 (4): 291–313. doi:10.1086/203441. ISSN 0011-3204. JSTOR 2743045. S2CID 143388176.
- Anthony, David W.; Ringe, Donald (January 2015). "The Indo-European Homeland from Linguistic and Archaeological Perspectives". Annual Review of Linguistics. 1 (1): 199–219. doi:10.1146/annurev-linguist-030514-124812.
- Anthony, David; Vinogradov, Nikolai (1995). "Birth of the Chariot". Archaeology. 48 (2): 36–41. JSTOR 41771098.
- Anthony, David W. (2013). "Two IE phylogenies, three PIE migrations, and four kinds of steppe pastoralism". Journal of Language Relationship. 9: 1–21. doi:10.31826/jlr-2013-090105.
- Blench, Roger; Spriggs, Matthew, eds. (1999). Archaeology and Language. Vol. III: Artefacts, languages and texts. London: Routledge.
- Bojtar, Endre (1999). Foreword to the Past: A Cultural History of the Baltic People. Budapest: Central European University Press.
- Cavalli-Sforza, Luigi Luca (2000). Genes, peoples, and languages. Farrar Straus & Giroux. ISBN 978-0-86547-529-8.
- Gimbutas, Marija (1956). The Prehistory of Eastern Europe. Part I: Mesolithic, Neolithic and Copper Age Cultures in Russia and the Baltic Area. Cambridge, MA: Peabody Museum..
- Gimbutas, Marija (1970). "Proto-Indo-European Culture: The Kurgan Culture during the Fifth, Fourth, and Third Millennia B.C.". In Cardona, George; Hoenigswald, Henry M.; Senn, Alfred (eds.). Indo-European and Indo-Europeans: Papers Presented at the Third Indo-European Conference at the University of Pennsylvania. Philadelphia: University of Pennsylvania Press. pp. 155–197. ISBN 0-8122-7574-8..
- Gimbutas, Marija (1982). "Old Europe in the Fifth Millenium B.C.: The European Situation on the Arrival of Indo-Europeans". In Polomé, Edgar C. (ed.). The Indo-Europeans in the Fourth and Third Millennia. Ann Arbor: Karoma Publishers. ISBN 0-89720-041-1.
- Gimbutas, Marija (Spring–Summer 1985). "Primary and Secondary Homeland of the Indo-Europeans: comments on Gamkrelidze–Ivanov articles". Journal of Indo-European Studies. 13 (1&2): 185–201.
- Gimbutas, Marija (1997). Dexter, Miriam Robbins; Jones-Bley, Karlene (eds.). The Kurgan Culture and the Indo-Europeanization of Europe: Selected Articles from 1952 to 1993. Journal of Indo-European Studies Monograph Series. Vol. 18. Washington, DC: Institute for the Study of Man. ISBN 978-0-941694-56-8..
- Gimbutas, Marija; Dexter, Miriam Robbins (1999). The Living Goddesses. Berkeley, Los Angeles: University of California Press. ISBN 0-520-22915-0.
- Haak W, Lazaridis I, Patterson N, Rohland N, et al. (2015). "Massive migration from the steppe was a source for Indo-European languages in Europe". Nature. 522 (7555): 207–211. arXiv:1502.02783. Bibcode:2015Natur.522..207H. bioRxiv 10.1101/013433. doi:10.1038/nature14317. PMC 5048219. PMID 25731166.
- Krell, Kathrin (1998). "Gimbutas' Kurgans-PIE homeland hypothesis: a linguistic critique". Archaeology and Language. vol. II. Blench and Spriggs.
- Librado, P.; Khan, N.; Fages, A.; et al. (2021). "The origins and spread of domestic horses from the Western Eurasian steppes". Nature. 598: 634–640. doi:10.1038/s41586-021-04018-9.
- Mallory, J. P. (1997). "Kurgan Tradition". Encyclopedia of Indo-European culture. London: Fitzroy Dearborn. pp. 338–341. ISBN 1-884964-98-2.
- Mallory, J. P. (1989). In Search of the Indo-Europeans: Language, Archaeology, and Myth. London: Thames & Hudson. ISBN 0-500-27616-1..
- Mallory, J. P. (1996). Fagan, Brian M. (ed.). The Oxford Companion to Archaeology. New York & Oxford: Oxford University Press. ISBN 0-19-507618-4.
- Mallory, J. P. (2013). "Twenty-first century clouds over Indo-European homelands". Journal of Language Relationship. 9: 145–154. doi:10.31826/jlr-2013-090113.
- Piazza, Alberto; Cavalli-Sforza, Luigi (2006). "Diffusion of genes and languages in human evolution". Proceedings of the 6th International Conference on the Evolution of Language. pp. 255–266. Archived from the original on 2008-12-11.
- Renfrew, Colin (1999). "Time depth, convergence theory, and innovation in Proto-Indo-European: 'Old Europe' as a PIE linguistic area". Journal of Indo-European Studies. 27 (3–4): 257–293.
- Schmoeckel, Reinhard (1999). Die Indoeuropäer. Aufbruch aus der Vorgeschichte [The Indo-Europeans: Rising from pre-history] (in German). Bergisch-Gladbach (Germany): Bastei Lübbe. ISBN 3-404-64162-0.
- Spinney, Laura (2025-03-13). Proto. London: William Collins. ISBN 978-0-00-862652-5.
- Strazny, Philipp, ed. (2000). Dictionary of Historical and Comparative Linguistics (1st ed.). Routledge. ISBN 978-1-57958-218-0.
- Wells, Spencer; Read, Mark (2002). The journey of man: a genetic odyssey. Princeton University Press. ISBN 978-0-691-11532-0.
- Zanotti, D. G. (1982). "The Evidence for Kurgan Wave One As Reflected By the Distribution of 'Old Europe' Gold Pendants". Journal of Indo-European Studies. 10: 223–234.
