= Seroglazovka culture =

Mesolithic archaeological culture

- Geographical range: Lower Volga
- Period: Mesolithic
- Dates: c. 8200 BC – c. 5500 BC
- Followed by: Orlovka culture

The Seroglazovka culture (Russian: сероглазовская культура) is a Mesolithic archaeological culture of the Pontic–Caspian steppe, dating to the late 9th millennium to mid-6th millennium BCE. It was first distinguished by A. Melentiev in the 1970s and is characterised by geometric microliths with Helwan retouch. Regional variants of the culture include the Zhekolgan group and the Istay group.
