= Sredny Stog culture =

Archaeological culture in Eastern Europe

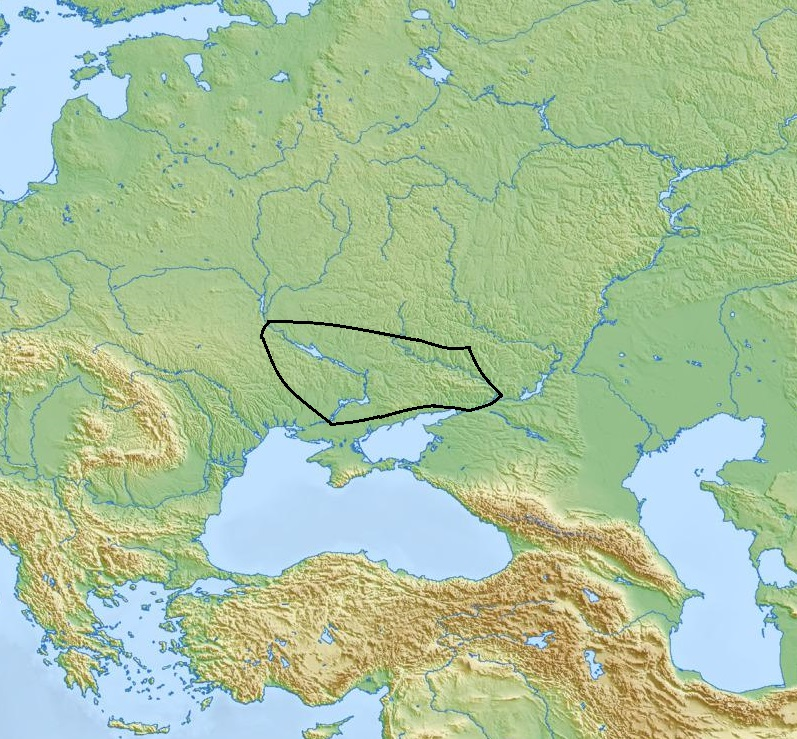
- Geographical range: Ukraine, Russia
- Period: Chalcolithic Europe
- Dates: mid 5th – mid 4th mill. BCE
- Preceded by: Dnieper-Donets culture, Mariupol culture
- Followed by: Cernavodă culture, Repin culture, Suvorovo culture, Novodanilovka group, Mykhailivka culture, Yamnaya culture

The Sredny Stog culture (Russian: Среднесто́говская культу́ра, romanized: Srednestogovskaja kul'tura, Ukrainian: Середньостогівська культура, romanized: Serednjostohivsjka kuljtura) or Serednii Stih culture is a pre-Kurgan archaeological culture from the mid. 5th – mid. 4th millennia BC. It is named after the Dnieper river islet of today's Serednii Stih (Ukrainian: Середній Стіг; Russian: Средний Стог, romanized: Sredny Stog), Ukraine, where it was first located.

== Distribution ==
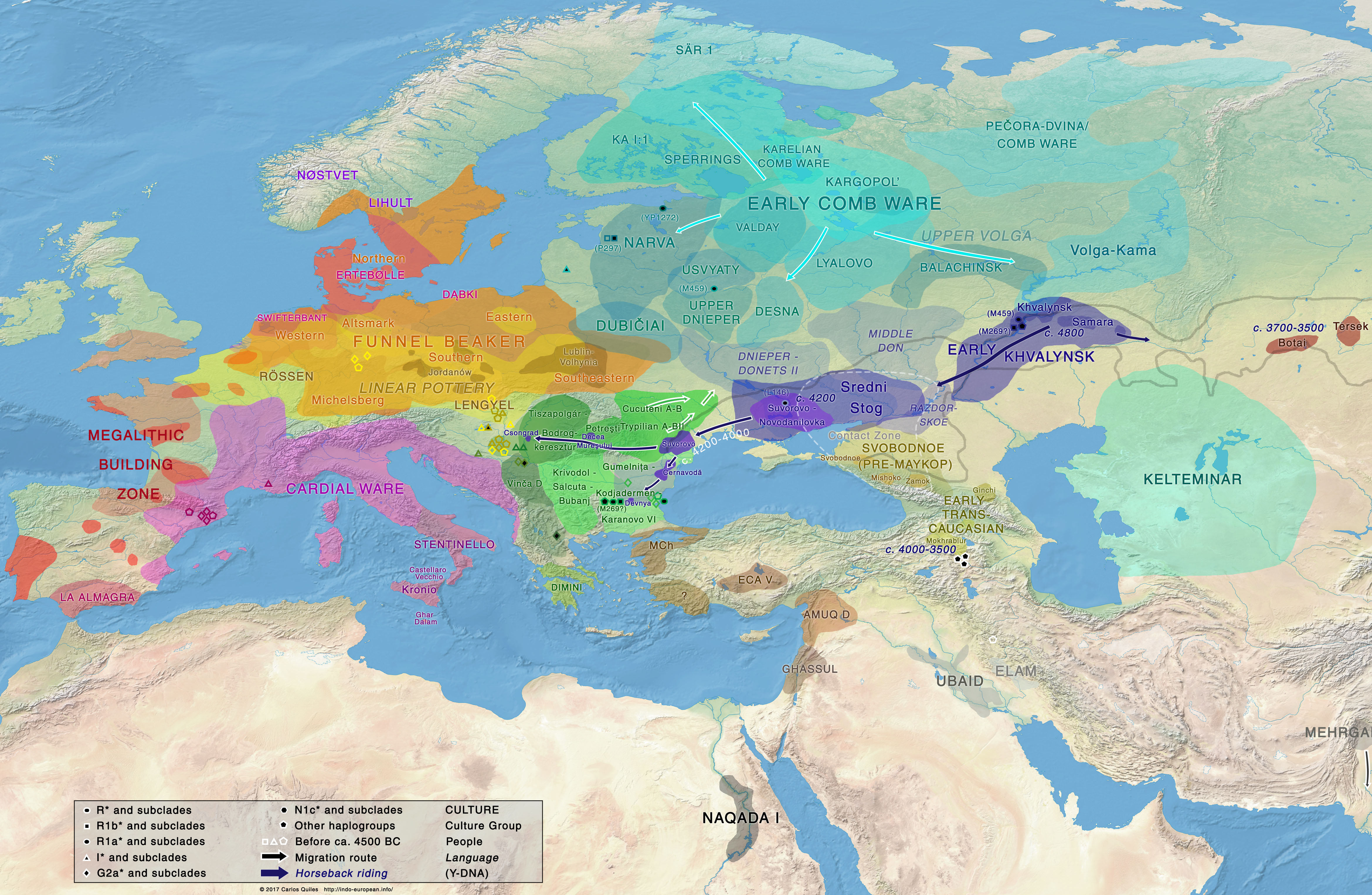
A diachronic map of Neolithic migrations c. 5000–4000 BC

Culture features appear across a wide territory in the Black Sea steppe from the Dnipro River, the upper Donets River, the lower Don region, and the Sea of Azov in the east to the delta of the Danube River in the west.

It seems to have had contact with the agricultural Cucuteni–Trypillian culture in the west, centered in modern-day Moldova, Romania and Ukraine, and was a contemporary of the Khvalynsk culture in the north-east, located in the middle Volga region.

== Sites ==
One of the sites most associated with this culture is Deriivka (Ukrainian: Деріївка, Russian: Дериевка), located on the right bank of the Omelnik, a tributary of the Dnieper, and is the largest site within the Sredny Stog culture complex, being about 2,000 square metres (22,000 sq ft) in area. The Eneolithic part of the Deriivka archaeological complex includes a settlement and a cemetery.

Other Sredny Stog sites include Igren-8 and Moliukhiv Buhor (Ukrainian: Молюхів Бугор, Russian: Молюхов Бугор, romanized: Molyukhov Bugor) on the Dnieper River, as well as Oleksandriia (Ukrainian: Олександрія, Russian: Александрия, romanized: Aleksandriya) on the Oskil River in east Ukraine.

== Characteristics ==
The Sredny Stog people lived rather mobile lives. This was seen in their temporary settlements, particularly their dwellings, which were simple rectilinear structures.

Dmytro Telegin has divided the chronology of Sredny Stog into two distinct phases. Phase I, middle 4th millennium BC, according to Telegin, included Sredny Stog complexes of the Strilcha Skelia-Sredny Stog II type, that contained pottery without the corded ornament.

Phase II, middle 3rd millennium BC, is represented by the Sredny Stog complexes of the Deriivka-Moliukhovyi Buhor type that used corded ware pottery which may have originated there, and stone battle-axes of the type later associated with expanding Indo-European cultures to the West. Most notably, it has perhaps the earliest evidence of horse domestication, with finds suggestive of cheek-pieces (psalia). There is no conclusive proof that those horses were used for riding, since they were mainly employed for gathering food. Sredny Stog periodization and chronology have undergone a revision in recent years.

Mobile steppe communities of the Sredny Stog archaeological complex likely emerged from the Azov-Dnipro-Donets area in the first half of the 5th millennium BCE.

== Burials ==
In its three largest cemeteries, Oleksandriia (39 individuals), Igren (17) and Deriivka II (14), evidence of burial in flat graves (ground level pits) has been found. This parallels the practice of the Cucuteni-Trypillia culture. It is in contrast with the later Yamnaya culture, which practiced tumuli burials.

In Sredny Stog culture, the deceased were laid to rest on their backs, with the legs flexed. The use of ochre in the burial was practiced, as with the kurgan cultures. For this and other reasons, Yuri Rassamakin suggests that the Sredny Stog culture should be considered as a real term, with at least four distinct cultural elements co-existing inside the same geographical area.

== Language ==
In the context of the modified Kurgan hypothesis of Marija Gimbutas, this pre-kurgan archaeological culture could represent the Urheimat (homeland) of the Proto-Indo-European language which others associate with the later Yamnaya culture.

It has been theorized that Cernavodă culture, together with the Sredny Stog culture, was the source of Anatolian languages and introduced them to Anatolia through the Balkans after Anatolian split from the Archaic-Proto-Indo-European language, which some linguists and archaeologists place in the area of the Sredny Stog culture. Other studies have suggested that the Indo-European language family may have originated not in Eastern Europe, but among West Asian populations south of the Caucasus.

Guus Kroonen et al. 2022 found that the "basal Indo-European stage", also known as Indo-Anatolian or Archaic-Proto-Indo-European language, largely but not totally, lacked agricultural-related vocabulary, and only the later "core Indo-European languages" saw an increase in agriculture-associated words. According to them, this fits a homeland of early core Indo-European within the westernmost Yamnaya horizon, around and west of the Dnieper, while its basal stage, Indo-Anatolian, may have originated in the Sredny Stog culture, as opposed to the eastern Yamnaya horizon.

They also argue that this new data contradicts a possible earlier origin of Archaic-PIE among agricultural societies South of the Caucasus, rather "this may support a scenario of linguistic continuity of local non-mobile herders in the Lower Dnieper region and their genetic persistence after their integration into the successive and expansive Yamnaya horizon". The authors mention that this scenario can explain the difference in paternal haplogroup frequency between the Yamnaya and Corded Ware cultures, while both sharing similar autosomal DNA ancestry.

== Physical type ==
Examination of physical remains of the Sredny Stog people has determined that they were Europoid. A similar physical type prevails among the Yamnaya, who were tall and powerfully built. People of the neighboring Khvalynsk culture were less powerfully built. (Note: "[M]assive broad-faced proto-Europoid type is a trait of post-Mariupol' cultures, Sredniy Stog, as well as the Pit-grave culture of the Dnieper's left bank, the Donets, and Don. The features of this type are somewhat moderated in the western part of the steppe... All the anthropological types of the Pit-grave culture population have indigenous roots... The heir of the Neolithic Dnieper–Donets and Sredniy Stog cultures was the Pit-grave culture. Its population possessed distinct Europoid features, was tall, with massive skulls. The second component were the descendants of those buried in the Eneolithic cemetery of Khvalynsk. They are less robust.") People of the preceding Dnieper–Donets culture were even more powerfully built than the people of the Sredny Stog and Yamnaya.

== Genetics ==
Sredny Stog culture individuals had highly variable genetic ancestry. Lazaridis et al. (2024) identified the 'Dnipro' Eneolithic genetic cline, involving populations with both Caucasus Neolithic and Lower Volga ancestry. As these populations moved westward and acquired Ukraine Neolithic hunter-gatherer (UNHG) ancestry, they formed the Sredny Stog culture.

An elite Sredny Stog male was found to be carrying CHG related paternal haplogroup J-M319 and the maternal haplogroup T2a1b.

Mathieson et al. (2018) included a genetic analysis of a male buried at Olexandria (Ukraine) and dated to 4153-3970 calBC, ascribed to the Sredny Stog culture. He was found to be carrying the paternal haplogroup R1a1a1, and the maternal haplogroup H2a1a. He carried about 80% Western Steppe Herder (WSH) ancestry and about 20% Early European Farmer (EEF) ancestry. This Sredny Stog male was thought to be the first steppe individual found to have been carrying EEF ancestry. As a carrier of the 13910 allele, he was supposed to be the earliest individual ever examined who has had a genetic adaptation to lactase persistence.

The October 2021 publication by David Reich Lab, presented another date from a different sample of the same individual, 2134–1950 cal BC, which could actually belong to Srubnaya culture period, as Haplotree Information Project considers this sample I6561 is from around 3650 ybp (c. 1700 BC), and belongs to Y-DNA R1a-F2597*, corresponding to R1a-Y3. The WSH genetic cluster was a result of mixing between Eastern Hunter-Gatherers (EHGs) from Eastern Europe and Caucasus hunter-gatherers (CHGs). This mixing appears to have happened on the eastern Pontic–Caspian steppe starting around 5,000 BC.

Matilla et al. (2023) presented whole-genome analysis of a Sredny Stog individual, dated to 4320-4052 calBC, from the Deriivka II archaeological site in the Middle Dnieper Valley. The authors conclude that a third of the genetic ancestry of the individual was derived from the local Neolithic Dnieper Valley ancestry, while the rest was of the Yamnaya-related steppe ancestry.

Another Eneolithic individual (4049-3945 calBC) carrying steppe ancestry, potentially from a Sredny Stog population, was identified at the Trypillian settlement of Kolomyitsiv Yar Tract (KYT) near Obykhiv in central Ukraine. At the whole genome level, the KYT individual was close to the Yamnaya from Ukraine and Russia, without forming a clade with Yamnaya. The authors suggested that genetic ancestry of the KYT individual was plausibly derived from a proto-Yamnaya population, with admixture from Iron Gates Mesolithic.

The steppe ancestry, otherwise known as Western Steppe Herder WSH ancestry, found in the Sredny Stog culture is similar to that of the Khvalynsk culture, among whom there was no EEF admixture. Males of the Khvalynsk culture carried primarily the paternal haplogroup R1b, although a few samples of R1a, I2a2, Q1a and J have been detected. Succeeding Yamnaya males, have been found to have carried only R1b and I2.

This is similar to the males of the earlier Dnieper-Donets culture, who carried R and I only and were almost exclusively EHGs with Western Hunter-Gatherer (WHG) admixture. The results suggest, as a possible yet highly simplified scenario, that the Yamnaya emerged through mixing between EHG and WHG males, and EEF and CHG females. This implies that the leading clans of the Yamnaya were of EHG paternal origin.

On this basis, David W. Anthony argues that the Indo-European languages were originally spoken by EHGs. Another hypothesis about the origin of the Indo-European (IE) languages links them with the Eneolithic circum-Pontic trade network and suggests the emergence of the ancestral IE tongue in the North Pontic steppe.

In 2022, genetic research found the Yamnaya to be a result of admixture between EHGs, CHGs, Anatolian Neolithic farmers and Levantine Neolithic farmers, with the mixture happening between an EHG + CHG population (Sredny Stog-like) and a CHG-like (CHG + Anatolia Neolithic + Levant Neolithic) population, with the admixture occurring around 4000BCE.

== Successors ==
The culture ended at around 3500 BC, when the Yamnaya culture expanded westward, replacing Sredny Stog, and coming into direct contact with the Cucuteni–Trypillia culture in western Ukraine.

== Sources ==
- Alexey G. Nikitin (2024). "Serednii Stih culture". Internet Encyclopedia of Ukraine.
- Anthony, David (Spring–Summer 2019a). "Archaeology, Genetics, and Language in the Steppes: A Comment on Bomhard". Journal of Indo-European Studies. 47 (1–2).
- Anthony, David W. (2019b). "Ancient DNA, Mating Networks, and the Anatolian Split". In Serangeli, Matilde; Olander, Thomas (eds.). Dispersals and Diversification: Linguistic and Archaeological Perspectives on the Early Stages of Indo-European. BRILL. pp. 21–54. ISBN 978-90-04-41619-2.
- Kuzmina, Elena E. (2007). Mallory, J. P. (ed.). The Origin of the Indo-Iranians. BRILL. ISBN 978-90-04-16054-5.
- Mallory, J. P. (1991). In Search of the Indo-Europeans: Language Archeology and Myth. Thames & Hudson.
- J. P. Mallory, "Sredny Stog Culture", Encyclopedia of Indo-European Culture, Fitzroy Dearborn, 1997.
- Mathieson, Iain (21 February 2018). "The Genomic History of Southeastern Europe". Nature. 555 (7695). Nature Research: 197–203. Bibcode:2018Natur.555..197M. doi:10.1038/nature25778. PMC 6091220. PMID 29466330.
