= Dnieper–Donets culture =

Prehistoric culture north of the Black Sea c. 5000–4200 BCE

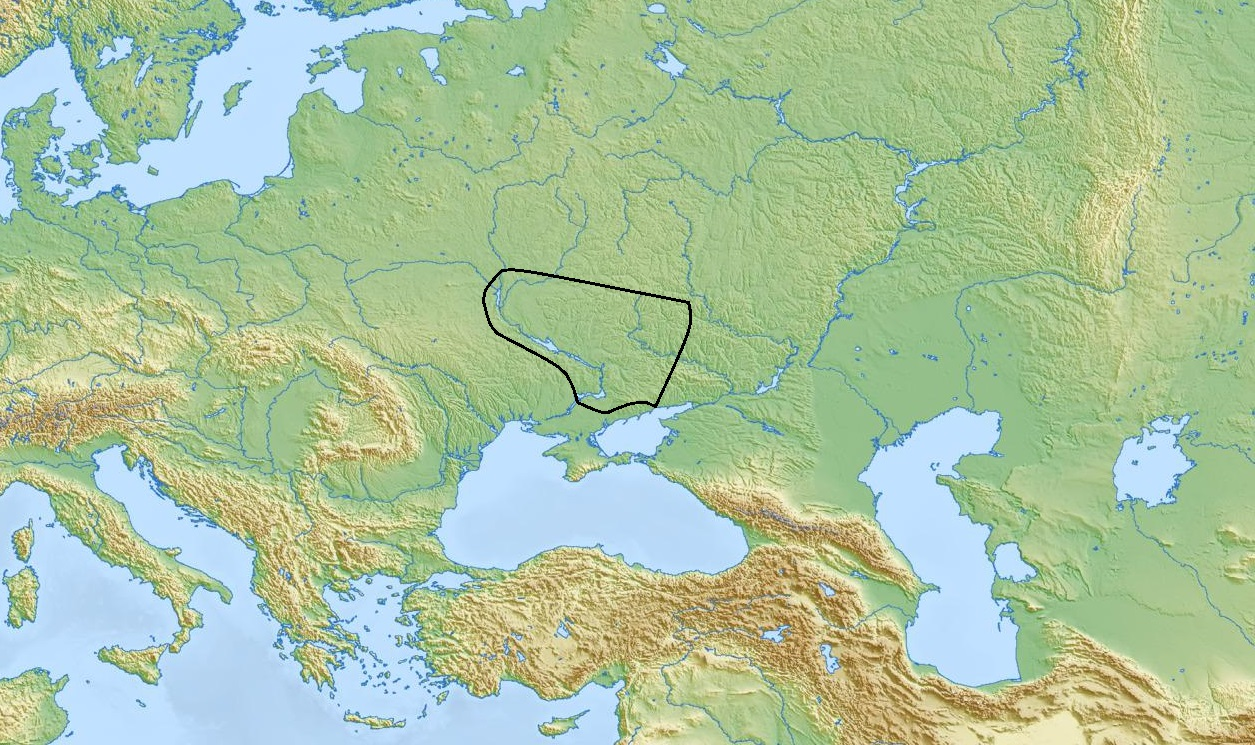
- Geographical range: North of the Black Sea
- Dates: c. 5000 BC – 4200 BC
- Preceded by: Janisławice culture Bug–Dniester culture
- Followed by: Sredny Stog culture

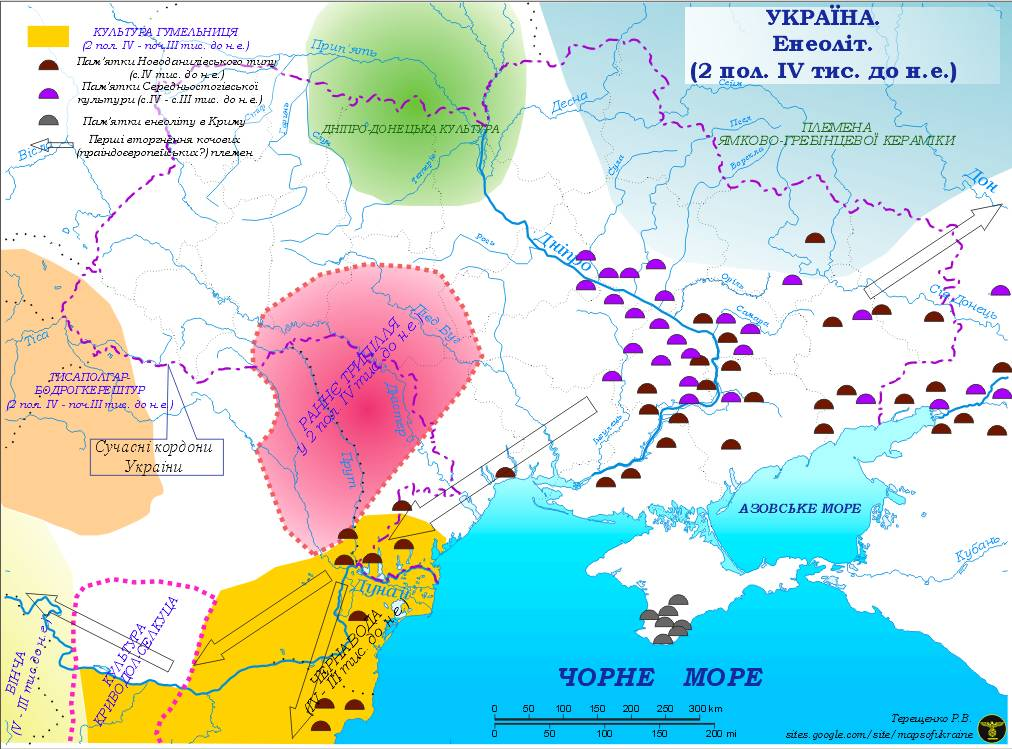
The Dnieper–Donets culture as a version on the Pripyat River instead of the Donets

The Dnieper–Donets culture complex (DDCC) (Note: Ukrainian: Дніпро-Донецька культура, romanized: Dnipro-Donecjka kuljtura.) (c. 5th—4th millennium BC) is a Mesolithic and later Neolithic archaeological culture found north of the Black Sea and dating to c. 5000-4200 BC. It has many parallels with the Samara culture, and was succeeded by the Sredny Stog culture.

== Discovery ==
The Dnieper–Donets culture complex was defined by the Soviet archaeologist Dmytro Telehin (Dmitriy Telegin) on proposition of another archaeologist Valentyn Danylenko in 1956. At that time Dmytro Telehin worked at the Institute of Archaeology of the Academy of Sciences of the Ukrainian SSR (1952 – 1990). In 1967, Telehin defended his doctorate dissertation "Dnieper–Donets Neolithic culture".

== Origin ==
David Anthony (2007: 155) dated the beginning of the Dnieper–Donets culture I to roughly between 5800 BC and 5200 BC. It quickly expanded in all directions, eventually absorbing all other local Neolithic groups. By 5200, BC the Dnieper–Donets culture II followed. It ended between 4400 BC and 4200 BC.

== Distribution ==
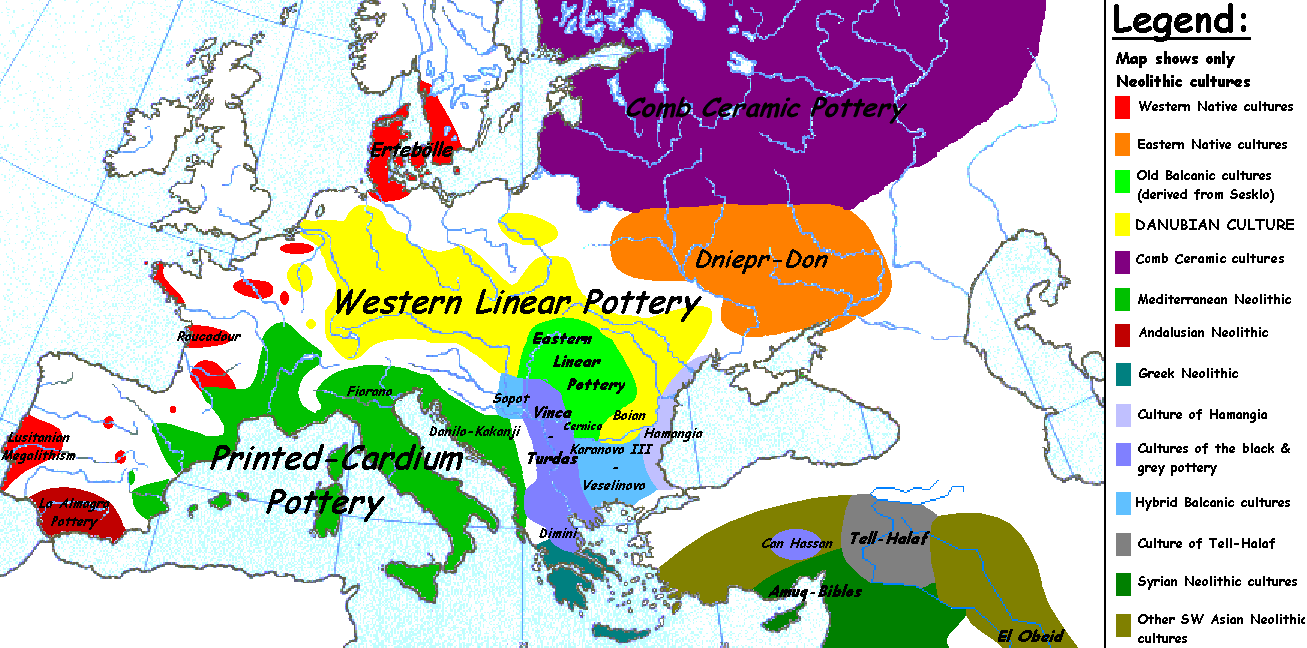
A map of European Neolithic cultures in c. 4500–4000 BC, showing the Dnieper-Donets culture in orange.

The Dnieper–Donets culture was distributed in the steppe and forest-steppe areas north of the Black Sea. Throughout its existence, rapid population growth and an expansion towards the steppe is noticeable.

There are parallels with the contemporaneous Samara culture to the north. Striking similarities with the Khvalynsk culture and the Sredny Stog culture have also been detected. A much larger horizon from the upper Vistula to the lower half of Dnieper to the mid-to-lower Volga has therefore been drawn.

Influences from the DDCC and the Sredny Stog culture on the Funnelbeaker culture have been suggested. An origin of the Funnelbeaker culture from the Dnieper–Donets culture has been suggested, but this is very controversial.

The Dnieper–Donets culture was contemporary with the Bug–Dniester culture. It is clearly distinct from the Cucuteni–Trypillia culture.

== Characteristics ==
=== Settlements ===
The Dnieper–Donets culture is known from more than 200 sites. Few settlements from the Dnieper–Donets culture are known, but a few semi-subterranean huts have been found. These huts were covered in bark.

=== Economy ===
The Dnieper–Donets culture was originally a hunter-gatherer culture. The economic evidence from the earliest stages is almost exclusively from hunting and fishing. Among the sources of food hunted and foraged by the Dnieper-Donets people were aurochs, elk, red deer, roe, wild boar, fox, wildcat, hare, bear and onager. Their diet was primarily high protein, with meat, fish and nuts being consumed.

From around 5200 BC, the Dnieper–Donets people began keeping cattle, sheep and goats. Other domestic animals kept included pigs, horses and dogs. During the following centuries, domestic animals from the Dnieper appeared further and further east towards the Volga-Ural steppes, reaching there around 4700–4600 BC. Some scholars suggest that from about 4200 BC, the Dnieper–Donets culture adopted agriculture.

Domestic plants that have been recovered include millet, wheat and pea. At the same time, recent evidence suggests that millet did not arrive in west Eurasia until the Bronze Age. Evidence from skeletal remains suggest that plants were consumed. At the same time, systematic evidence of producing economy in DDCC is currently lacking.

The presence of exotic goods in Dnieper-Donets graves indicates exchange relationships with the Caucasus.

=== Art ===
The Dnieper–Donets culture produced no female figurines.

=== Burials ===
The Dnieper–Donets culture is well known for about thirty of its cemeteries that have been discovered. This includes several large collective cemeteries of the Mariupol type. These contain around 800 individuals. It is evident that funerals were complex events that had several phases.

Burials are mostly in large pits where the deceased were periodically placed and covered with ocher. In some cases, the deceased may have been exposed for a time before their bones were collected and buried. In most cases, the deceased were buried in the flesh without exposure. Deceased Dnieper-Donets people sometimes had only their skulls buried, but most often the entire bodies. The variants of Dnieper-Donets burial often appear in the same pits. Animal bones has also been found in the graves.

Certain Dnieper-Donets burials are accompanied with copper, crystal or porphyry ornaments, shell beads, bird-stone tubes, polished stone maces or ornamental plaques made of boar's tusk. The items, along with the presence of animal bones and sophisticated burial methods, appear to have been a symbol of power. Certain deceased children were buried with such items, which indicates that wealth was inherited in Dnieper-Donets society. Very similar boar-tusk plaques and copper ornaments have been found at contemporary graves of the Samara culture in the middle Volga area. Maces of a different type than those of Dnieper-Donets have also been found. The wide adoption of such a status symbol attests to the existence of the institute of power in DDCC.

Individual, double and triple burials have also been found at DDCC cemeteries. These have been attributed to the earlier period of DDCC. Radiocarbon dates confirm the earlier chronology of individual DDCC burials compared to collective graves in large pits.

Dnieper–Donets burials have been found near the settlement of Deriivka, which is associated with the Sredny Stog culture.

=== Tools ===
The Dnieper–Donets culture continued using Mesolithic technology, but later phases see the appearance of polished stone axes, later flint and the disappearance of microliths. These tools were sometimes deposited in graves.

=== Pottery ===
Dnieper-Donets pottery was initially pointed based, but in later phases flat-based wares emerge. Their pottery is completely different from those made by the nearby Cucuteni–Trypillia culture. The importance of pottery appears to have increased throughout the existence of the Dnieper–Donets culture, which implies a more sedentary lifestyle.

The early use of typical point base pottery interrelates with other Mesolithic cultures that are peripheral to the expanse of the Neolithic farmer cultures. The special shape of this pottery has been related to transport by logboat in wetland areas. Especially related are Swifterbant in the Netherlands, Ellerbek and Ertebølle in Northern Germany and Scandinavia, "Ceramic Mesolithic" pottery of Belgium and Northern France (including non-Linear pottery such as La Hoguette, Bliquy, Villeneuve-Saint-Germain), the Roucadour culture in Southwest France and the river and lake areas of Northern Poland and Russia.

== Linguistics ==
In accordance with the original Kurgan hypothesis, J.P. Mallory (1997) suggested that the Dnieper–Donets people were Pre–Indo-European-speakers who were absorbed by Proto-Indo-Europeans expanding westwards from steppe-lands further east.

According to David W. Anthony, the Indo-European languages were initially spoken by EHGs living in Eastern Europe, such as the Dnieper–Donets people. He (2007) also argues that the Dnieper–Donets people almost certainly spoke a different language from the people of the Cucuteni–Trypillia culture.

The precise role of the culture and its language to the derivation of the Pontic–Caspian cultures, such as Sredny Stog, Repin and Yamnaya, is open to debate, but the display of recurrent traits points to longstanding mutual contacts or to underlying genetic relations.

== Genetics ==
The first archaeogenetic analysis involving DDCC individuals was published by Nikitin et al. in 2012. The authors reported mtDNA haplogroups of two individuals from the Mykilske (Nikols'skoye in Russian) and Yasynuvatka (Yasinovatka) DDCC cemeteries. Haplogroups of west Eurasian (H, U3, U5a1a) and east Eurasian (C, C4a) descent have been identified. The authors linked the appearance of east Eurasian haplogroups with potential influence from northern Lake Baikal area.

Mathieson et al. (2018) analyzed 32 individuals from three Eneolithic cemeteries at Deriivka, Vilnyanka and Vovnigi, which Anthony (2019a) ascribed to the Dnieper–Donets culture. These individuals belonged exclusively to the paternal haplogroups R and I (mostly R1b and I2), and almost exclusively to the maternal haplogroup U (mostly U5, U4 and U2). This suggests that the Dnieper-Donets people were "distinct, locally derived population" of mostly of Eastern Hunter-Gatherer (EHG) descent, with Western Hunter-Gatherer (WHG) admixture. The WHG admixture appears to have increased in the transition from the Mesolithic to the Neolithic.

Unlike the Yamnaya culture, whose genetic cluster is known as Western Steppe Herder (WSH), in the Dnieper–Donets culture no Caucasian Hunter-Gatherer (CHG) or Early European Farmer (EEF) ancestry has been detected . At the same time, several Eneolithic individuals from the Deriivka I cemetery carried Anatolian Neolithic Farmer (ANF) - derived, as well as WSH ancestry.

At the Vilnyanka cemetery, all the males belong to the paternal haplogroup I, which is common among WHGs. David W. Anthony suggests that this influx of WHG ancestry might be the result of EEFs pushing WHGs out of their territories to the east, where WHG males might have mated with EHG females.

Dnieper-Donets males and Yamnaya males carry the same paternal haplogroups (R1b and I2a), suggesting that the CHG and EEF admixture among the Yamnaya came through EHG and WHG males mixing with EEF and CHG females. According to Anthony, this suggests that the Indo-European languages were initially spoken by EHGs living in Eastern Europe

== Successors ==
The Dnieper–Donets culture was succeeded by the Sredny Stog culture, its eastern neighbor, with whom it co-existed for a time before being finally absorbed. The Dnieper–Donets culture and the Sredny Stog culture were in turn succeeded by the Yamnaya culture. The Mikhaylovka culture, the Novodanilovka group and the Kemi Oba culture displays evidence of continuity from the Dnieper–Donets culture.

== See also ==
- Deriivka
- Catacomb culture
- Comb Ceramic culture
- Narva culture
- Pitted Ware culture
- Rzucewo culture

== Bibliography ==
- Anthony, David W. (2010). The Horse, the Wheel, and Language: How Bronze-Age Riders from the Eurasian Steppes Shaped the Modern World. Princeton University Press. ISBN 978-1-4008-3110-4.
- Anthony, David (Spring–Summer 2019a). "Archaeology, Genetics, and Language in the Steppes: A Comment on Bomhard". Journal of Indo-European Studies. 47 (1–2).
- Anthony, David W. (2019b). "Ancient DNA, Mating Networks, and the Anatolian Split". In Serangeli, Matilde; Olander, Thomas (eds.). Dispersals and Diversification: Linguistic and Archaeological Perspectives on the Early Stages of Indo-European. BRILL. pp. 21–54. ISBN 978-90-04-41619-2.
- de Roever, Jutta Paulina (2004). Swifterbant-aardewerk: Een analyse van de neolithische nederzettingen bij Swifterbant, 5e millennium voor Christus (PDF) (in Dutch). Barkhuis. Archived from the original (PDF) on 27 February 2008.
- Kuzmina, Elena E. (2007). Mallory, J. P. (ed.). Encyclopedia of Indo-European Culture. BRILL. ISBN 978-90-04-16054-5.
- Mallory, J. P. (1991). In Search of the Indo-Europeans: Language Archeology and Myth. Thames & Hudson.
- Mallory, J. P.; Adams, Douglas Q. (1997). Encyclopedia of Indo-European Culture. Taylor & Francis. ISBN 1-884964-98-2.
- Mathieson, Iain (21 February 2018). "The Genomic History of Southeastern Europe". Nature. 555 (7695). Nature Research: 197–203. Bibcode:2018Natur.555..197M. doi:10.1038/nature25778. PMC 6091220. PMID 29466330. * Templeton, A. (2016). "Evolution and Notions of Human Race". In Losos, J.; Lenski, R. (eds.). How Evolution Shapes Our Lives: Essays on Biology and Society. Princeton; Oxford: Princeton University Press. pp. 346–361. doi:10.2307/j.ctv7h0s6j.26. "... the answer to the question whether races exist in humans is clear and unambiguous: no."
- Wagner, Jennifer K.; Yu, Joon-Ho; Ifekwunigwe, Jayne O.; Harrell, Tanya M.; Bamshad, Michael J.; Royal, Charmaine D. (February 2017). "Anthropologists' views on race, ancestry, and genetics". American Journal of Physical Anthropology. 162 (2): 318–327. Bibcode:2017AJPA..162..318W. doi:10.1002/ajpa.23120. PMC 5299519. PMID 27874171.
- American Association of Physical Anthropologists (27 March 2019). "AAPA Statement on Race and Racism". American Association of Physical Anthropologists.
- Pickering, Robert (2009). The Use of Forensic Anthropology. CRC Press. p. 82. ISBN 978-1-4200-6877-1.
- Herbst, Philip (15 June 1997). The color of words: an encyclopaedic dictionary of ethnic bias in the United States. Intercultural Press. ISBN 978-1-877864-97-1. "Though discredited as an anthropological term and not recommended in most editorial guidelines, it is still heard and used, for example, as a category on forms asking for ethnic identification. It is also still used for police blotters (the abbreviated Cauc may be heard among police) and appears elsewhere as a euphemism. Its synonym, Caucasoid, also once used in anthropology but now dated and considered pejorative, is disappearing."
- Mukhopadhyay, Carol C. (30 June 2008). "Getting Rid of the Word 'Caucasian'". In Mica Pollock (ed.). Everyday Antiracism: Getting Real About Race in School. New Press. pp. 14–. ISBN 978-1-59558-567-7. "Yet there is one striking exception in our modern racial vocabulary: the term 'Caucasian'. Despite being a remnant of a discredited theory of racial classification, the term has persisted into the twenty-first century, within as well as outside of the educational community. It is high time we got rid of the word Caucasian. Some might protest that it is 'only a label'. But language is one of the most systematic, subtle, and significant vehicles for transmitting racial ideology. Terms that describe imagined groups, such as Caucasian, encapsulate those beliefs. Every time we use them and uncritically expose students to them, we are reinforcing rather than dismantling the old racialized worldview. Using the word Caucasian invokes scientific racism, the false idea that races are naturally occurring, biologically ranked subdivisions of the human species and that Caucasians are the superior race. Beyond this, the label Caucasian can even convey messages about which groups have culture and are entitled to recognition as Americans."
- Kohlman, Michael J. (14 June 2013). "Evangelizing Eugenics: A Brief Historiography of Popular and Formal American Eugenics Education (1908-1948)". Alberta Journal of Educational Research. 58 (4): 657–690. doi:10.55016/ojs/ajer.v58i4.55683. ISSN 0002-4805.
