= Yamnaya culture =

Archaeological culture in the Pontic steppe circa 3300 BCE

- Alternative names: Pit Grave culture; Yamna culture; Ochre Grave culture; Yamnaya Horizon
- Geographical range: Pontic–Caspian steppe in Europe
- Period: Copper Age, Bronze Age
- Dates: c. 3300–2600 BC
- Major sites: Kétegyháza, Sárrétudvari, Jabuka, Pančevo, Perlez, Vojlovica, Boyanovo, Drazhevo, Smyadovo, Smeeni, Glăvănești, Gurbănești, Ripiceni, Cimișlia, Taraclia, Purcari, Yampil, Vinnytsia Oblast, Maiaky, Odesa Raion, Odesa Oblast, Mykhailivka, Beryslav Raion, Kherson Oblast, Berezhnovka, Kurmanayevka
- Preceded by: Sredny Stog culture, Samara culture, Khvalynsk culture, Dnieper–Donets culture, Repin culture, Maykop culture, Cucuteni–Trypillia culture, Cernavodă culture, Usatove culture, Novosvobodnaya culture, Mikhailovka culture (3600–3000 BCE)
- Followed by: North: Corded Ware culture; West: Catacomb culture, Vučedol culture; East: Poltavka culture
- Defined by: Vasily Gorodtsov

The Yamnaya (/ˈjæm.naɪ.ə/, YAM-ny-ə), or Yamna (/ˈjæm.nə/, YAM-nə), (Note: Russian: Ямная культура, romanized: Yámnaya kul'túra, pronounced [ˈjamnəjə kʊlʲˈturə]; Ukrainian: Ямна культура, romanized: Yámna kul'túra, pronounced [ˈjɑmnɐ kʊlʲˈturɐ]; lit. 'culture of pits', from яма 'pit, hole'.) culture, also known as the Pit Grave culture or Ochre Grave culture, was a late Copper Age to early Bronze Age archaeological culture of the region between the Southern Bug, Dniester, and Ural rivers (the Pontic–Caspian steppe), dating to 3300–2600 BC. It was discovered by Vasily Gorodtsov following his archaeological excavations near the Donets River in 1901–1903. Its name derives from its characteristic burial tradition: yamnaya (ямная) is a Russian adjective that means 'related to pits' (яма, yama), as these people buried their dead in tumuli (kurgans) containing simple pit chambers. Archaeological and genetic data indicate that the core Yamnaya culture (3750–3350 BC) originated in the lower Dnieper–Don steppe region.

The Yamnaya culture is of particular interest to archaeologists and linguists, as the widely accepted Kurgan hypothesis posits that the people who produced the Yamnaya culture spoke a stage of the Proto-Indo-European language. The speakers of the Proto-Indo-European (PIE) language embarked on the Indo-European migrations, which gave rise to today's widely dispersed Indo-European languages.

The Yamnaya economy was based upon animal husbandry, fishing and foraging and the manufacture of ceramics, tools and weapons. The people of the Yamnaya culture were nomads or semi-nomads, who were organised in a chiefdom system and relied on riding horses to manage large herds, as well as on wheeled carts and wagons for long-distance travel. They are also closely connected to Final Neolithic cultures, which later spread throughout Europe and Central Asia, especially the Corded Ware people and the Bell Beaker culture, as well as the peoples of the Sintashta, Andronovo and Srubnaya cultures. Back migration from Corded Ware also contributed to Sintashta and Andronovo.

Other groups exist with several aspects in common with the Yamnaya culture. (Note: Yamnayan cultural aspects included horse-riding, burial styles and to some extent the pastoralist economy.) Yamnaya material culture was very similar to the Afanasievo culture of southern Siberia, and both cultures' populations are genetically indistinguishable. This suggests that the Afanasievo culture may have originated from the migration of Yamnaya groups to the Altai region or, alternatively, that both cultures developed from an earlier shared cultural source.

Genetic studies have suggested that the people of the Yamnaya culture can be modelled as a genetic admixture between a population related to Eastern European Hunter-Gatherers (EHG) (Note: The Eastern European hunter-gatherers were themselves descended mostly from ancient North Eurasians, who were related to the palaeolithic Mal'ta–Buret' culture.) and people related to hunter-gatherers from the Caucasus (CHG) in roughly equal proportions, an ancestral component that is often named "Steppe ancestry", with additional admixture from Anatolian, Levantine, or Early European farmers. More recent, higher-resolution genetic modelling (2025) has refined this, identifying the Yamnaya as deriving approximately 80% of their ancestry from a distinct Caucasus-Lower Volga (CLV) population, rather than a simple 50/50 mix.

Genetic studies also indicate that populations associated with the Corded Ware, Bell Beaker, Sintashta and Andronovo cultures derived large parts of their ancestry from the Yamnaya or a closely related population. Recent genetic analyses indicate that the Anatolian component in the Yamnaya came from the Caucasus Neolithic population, not from Anatolia-derived European farmers.

== Origins ==
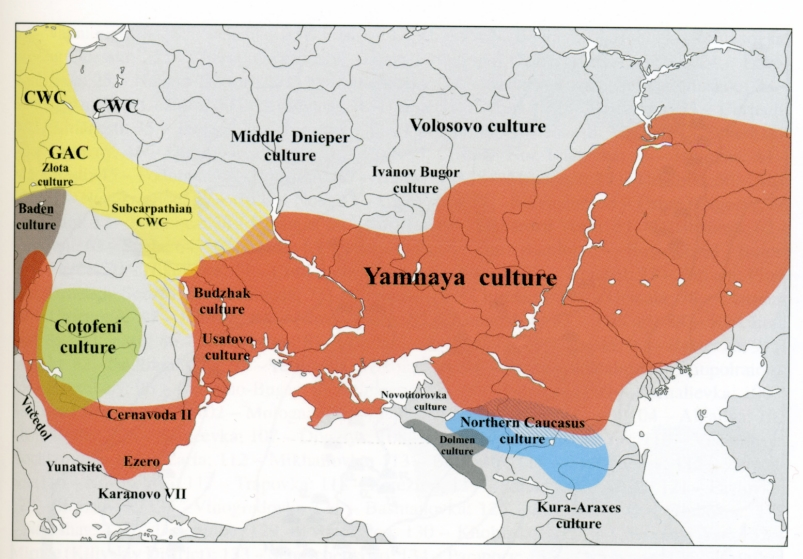
A map of the largest extent of the Yamnaya culture. Modified from c. 3500 origins of Usatovo culture; 3300 origins of Yamna; c. 3300–3200 expansion of Yamnaya across the Pontic-Caspian steppe; c. 2700 end of Cucuteni-Trypillia culture, and transformation of Yamnaya into Corded Ware in the contact zone east of the Carpathian mountains; 3100–2600 Yamnaya expansion into the Danube Valley.

The Yamnaya culture was defined by Vasily Gorodtsov to differentiate it from the Catacomb and Srubnaya cultures, which existed in the area, but were considered to be of a later period. The time interval to the Yamnaya culture and the reliance on archaeological findings cause debate as to its origin to be ongoing. In 1996, Pavel Dolukhanov suggested that the emergence of the Pit-Grave culture represents a social development of various different local Bronze Age cultures and thus represents "an expression of social stratification and the emergence of chiefdom-type nomadic social structures", which in turn intensified intergroup contacts between essentially heterogeneous social groups.

The origin of the Yamnaya culture continues to be debated, with proposals for its origins pointing to both the Khvalynsk and the Sredny Stog cultures. The Khvalynsk culture (4700–3800 BC) (middle Volga) and the Don-based Repin culture (c. 3950–3300 BC), in the eastern Pontic-Caspian steppe, and the closely related Sredny Stog culture (c. 4500–3500 BC), in the western Pontic-Caspian steppe, preceded the Yamnaya culture (3300–2500 BC).

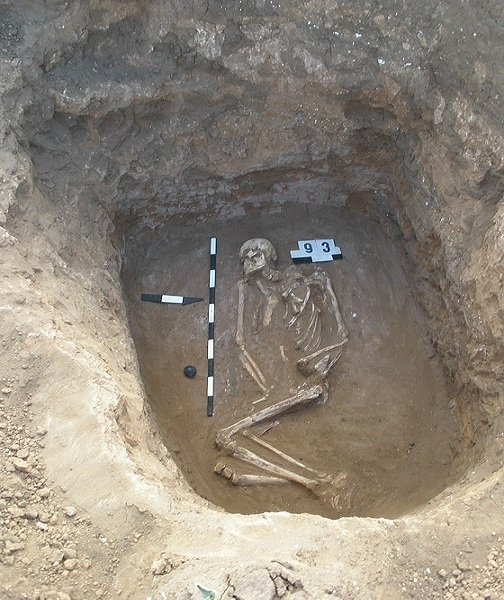
A Yamnaya culture grave, Volgograd Oblast

Further efforts to pinpoint the location have come from Anthony (2007), who suggested that the Yamnaya culture (3300–2600 BC) originated in the Don–Volga area at c. 3400 BC, preceded by the middle Volga-based Khvalynsk culture and the Don-based Repin culture (c. 3950–3300 BC), and argued that late pottery from both cultures can barely be distinguished from early Yamnaya pottery. Earlier continuity from eneolithic but largely hunter-gatherer Samara culture and influences from the more agricultural Dnieper–Donets II are apparent.

He argues that the early Yamnaya horizon spread quickly across the Pontic–Caspian steppes between c. 3400 and 3200 BC:

The spread of the Yamnaya horizon was the material expression of the spread of late Proto-Indo-European across the Pontic–Caspian steppes.

[…] The Yamnaya horizon is the visible archaeological expression of a social adjustment to high mobility – the invention of the political infrastructure to manage larger herds from mobile homes based in the steppes.

Alternatively, Parpola (2015) relates both the Corded ware and the Yamnaya cultures to the late Trypillia (Tripolye) culture. He hypothesises that "the Tripolye culture was taken over by PIE speakers by c. 4000 BC" and that in its final phase the Trypillian culture expanded to the steppes, morphing into various regional cultures which fused with the late Sredny Stog (Serednii Stih) pastoralist cultures, which, he suggests, gave rise to the Yamnaya culture. Dmytro Telegin viewed Sredny Stog and Yamnaya as one cultural continuum and considered Sredny Stog to be the genetic foundation of the Yamnaya. Telegin's view has recently been confirmed by genetic analyses. The temporal gap between Sredny Stog and the Yamnaya is bridged by Mikhailovka culture, which extended along the lower Dnieper River in Ukraine and the lower Don River in Russia and as a late transitional stage associated with one of the likely epicenters of Yamnaya culture formation (c. 3600–3400 BC).

The Yamnaya culture was succeeded in its western range by the Catacomb culture (2800–2200 BC) and in the eastern range by the Poltavka culture (2700–2100 BC) on the middle Volga. Both cultures were followed by the Srubnaya culture (18th–12th century BC).

Maps of the origins of Yamnaya culture

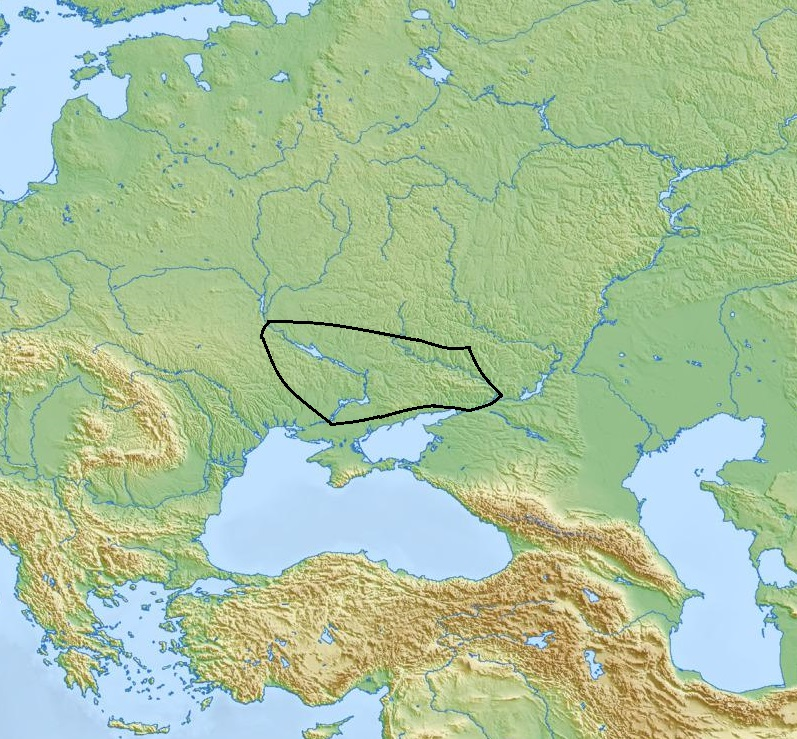
Sredny Stog culture (c. 4500–3500 BC)

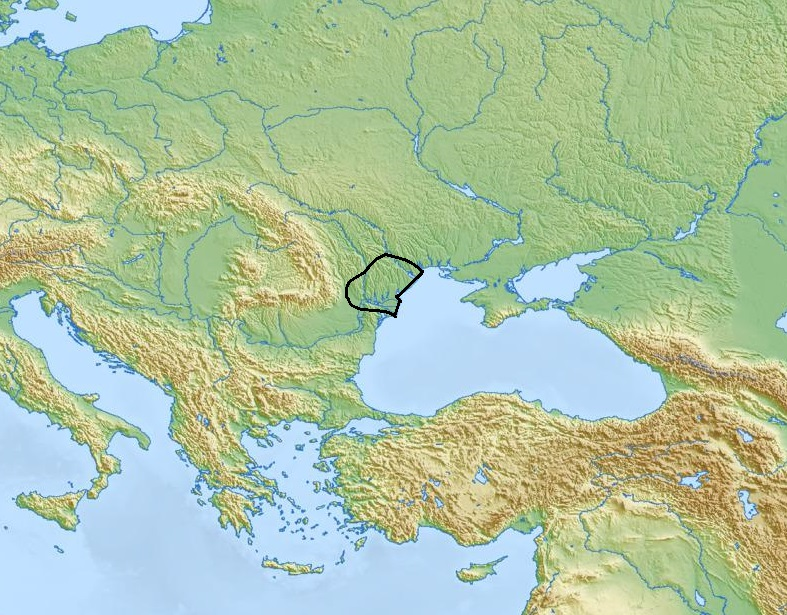
Usatovo culture (c. 3500–3000 BC)

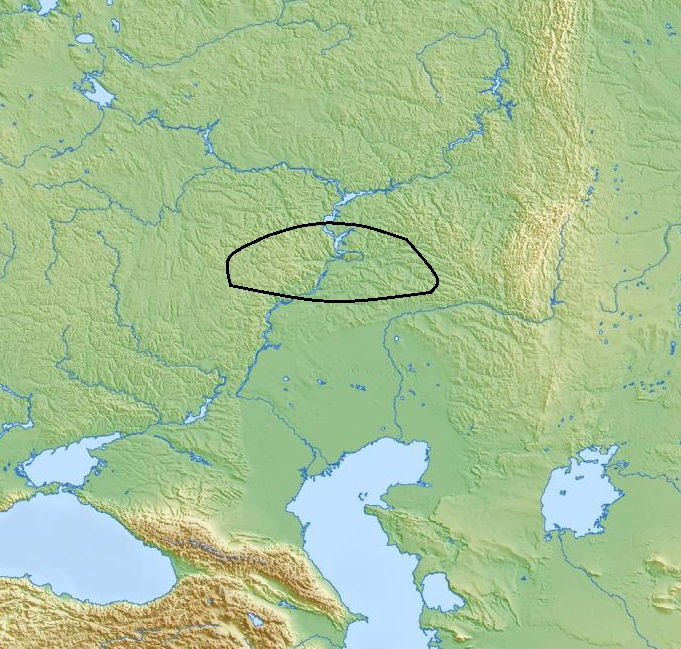
Khvalynsk culture (c. 4900–3500 BC)

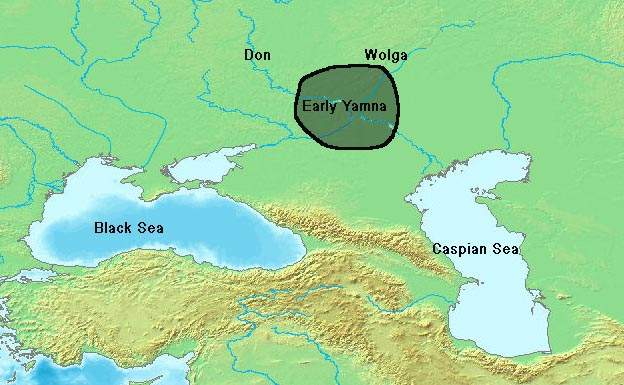
Early Yamnaya culture (3400 BC), according to Anthony (2007)

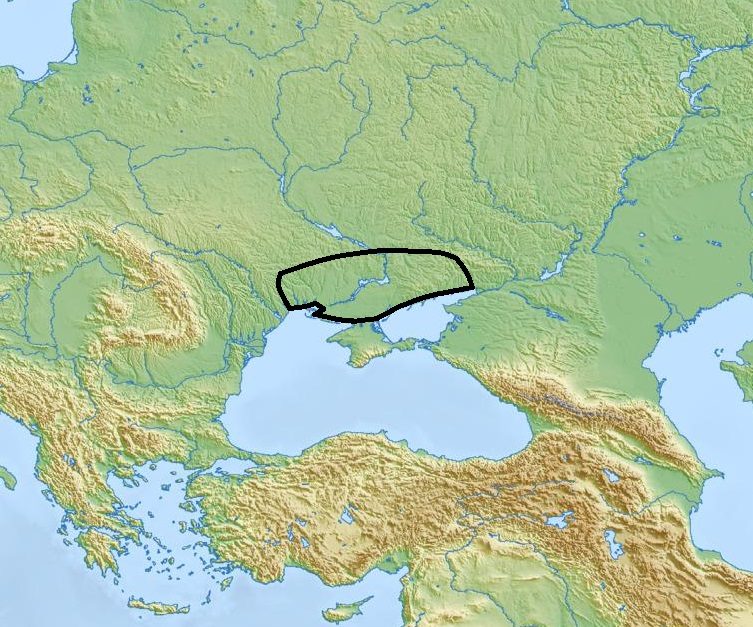
Mikhailovka culture (c. 3600–3400 BC)

== Characteristics ==
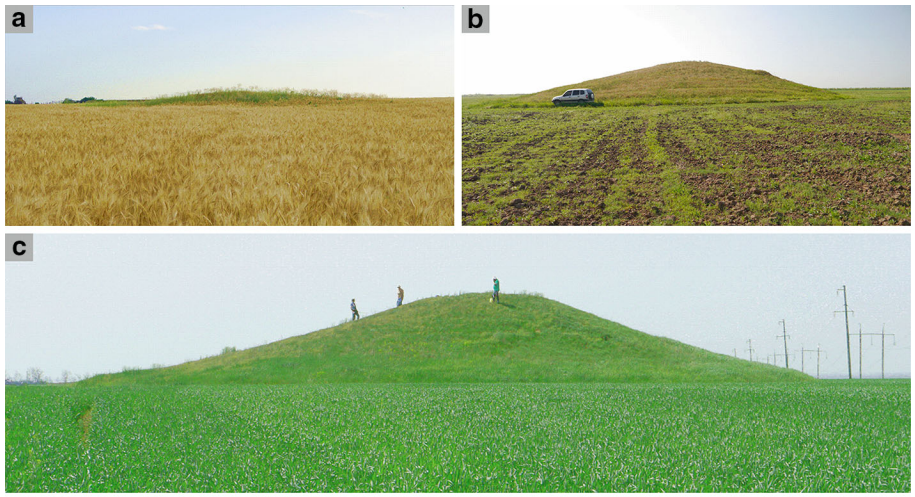
Remains of kurgans (tumuli) in southern Ukraine

The Yamnaya culture was nomadic or semi-nomadic, with some agriculture practiced near rivers and a few fortified sites, the largest of which is Mikhailovka.

Characteristic of the culture are the burials in pit graves surmounted by kurgans (tumuli), often accompanied by animal offerings. Some graves contain large anthropomorphic stelae, with carved human heads, arms, hands, belts and weapons. The bodies were placed in a supine position with bent knees and covered in ochre. Some kurgans contained "stratified sequences of graves". Kurgan burials may have been rare and perhaps were reserved for special adults, who were predominantly male.

Status and gender are marked by grave goods and position, and in some areas elite individuals are buried with complete wooden wagons. Grave goods are more common in eastern Yamnaya burials, which are also characterized by a higher proportion of male burials and more male-centred rituals than in western areas.

The Yamnaya culture used two-wheeled carts and four-wheeled wagons, which are thought to have been oxen-drawn at this time, and there is evidence that the people rode horses. For instance, several Yamnaya skeletons exhibit specific characteristics in their bone morphology that may have been caused by long-term horseriding. The evidence is disputed by the archaeozoologist William T. Taylor, who argues that domestication of the horse long postdates the Yamnaya culture. Recent genetic studies indicate that horse domestication in Eurasia happened after c. 2700 BC.

Metallurgists and other craftsmen are given a special status in Yamnaya society, and metal objects are sometimes found in large quantities in elite graves. New metalworking technologies and weapon designs are used.

Stable isotope ratios of Yamnaya individuals from the Dnieper Valley suggest the Yamnaya diet was terrestrial-protein-based with insignificant contribution from freshwater or aquatic resources. Anthony speculates that the Yamnaya ate meat, milk, yogurt, cheese, and soups made from seeds and wild vegetables and probably consumed mead.

Mallory and Adams suggest that Yamnaya society may have had a tripartite structure, with three differentiated social classes, but the evidence available does not demonstrate the existence of specific classes, such as priests, warriors and farmers.

== Gallery ==
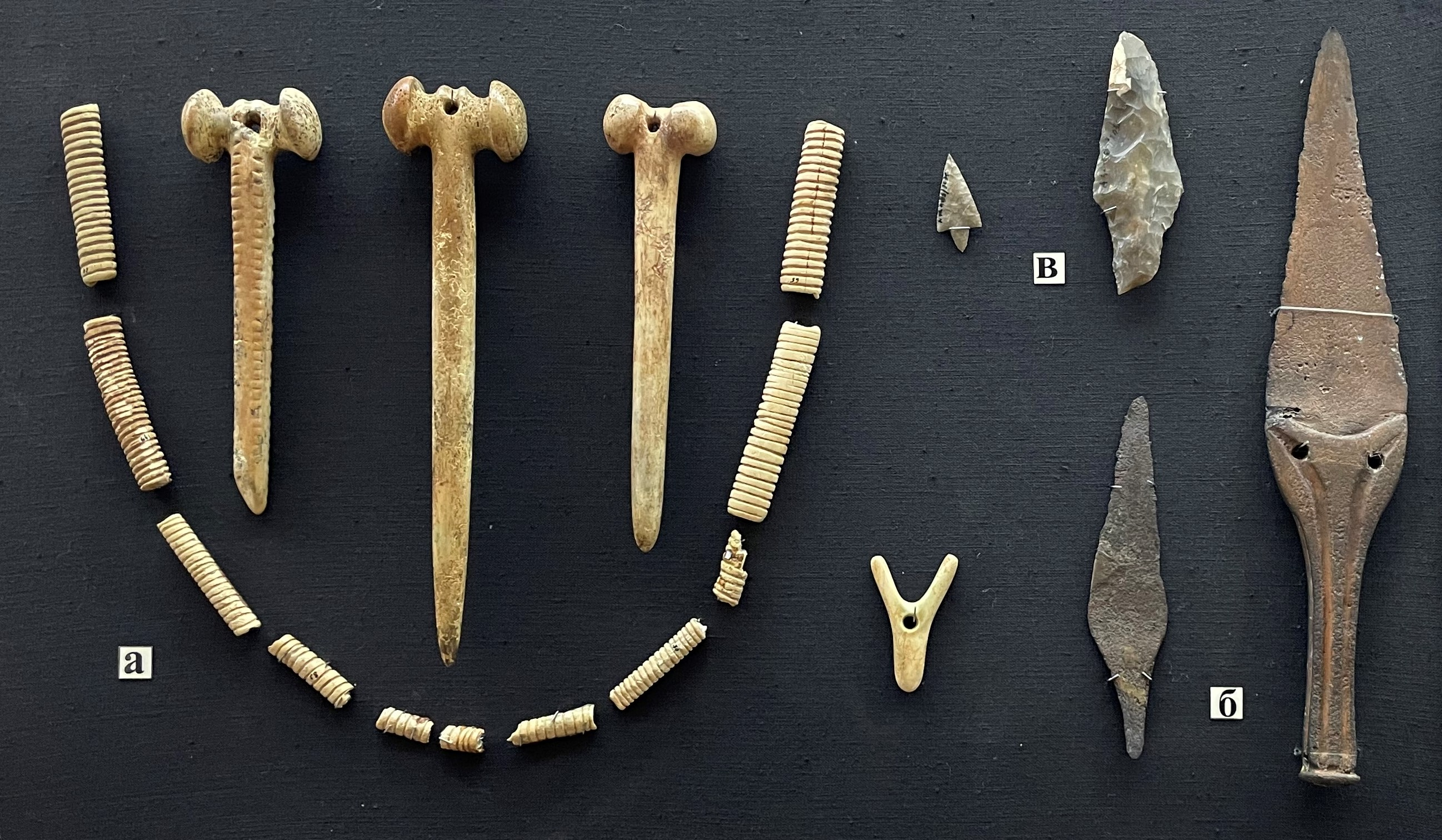
Daggers, arrowheads and bone artefacts

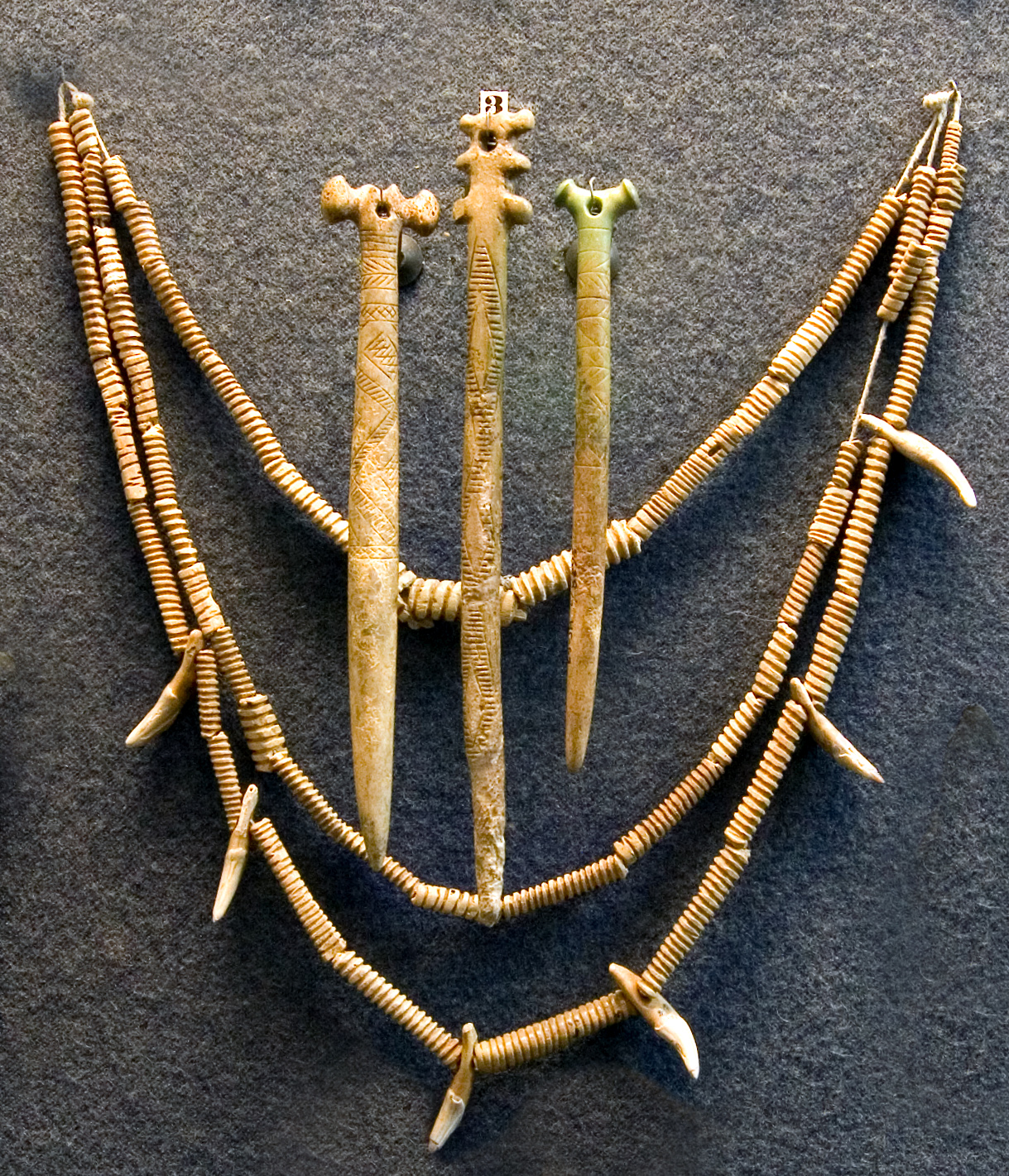
Yamnaya decorative artifacts

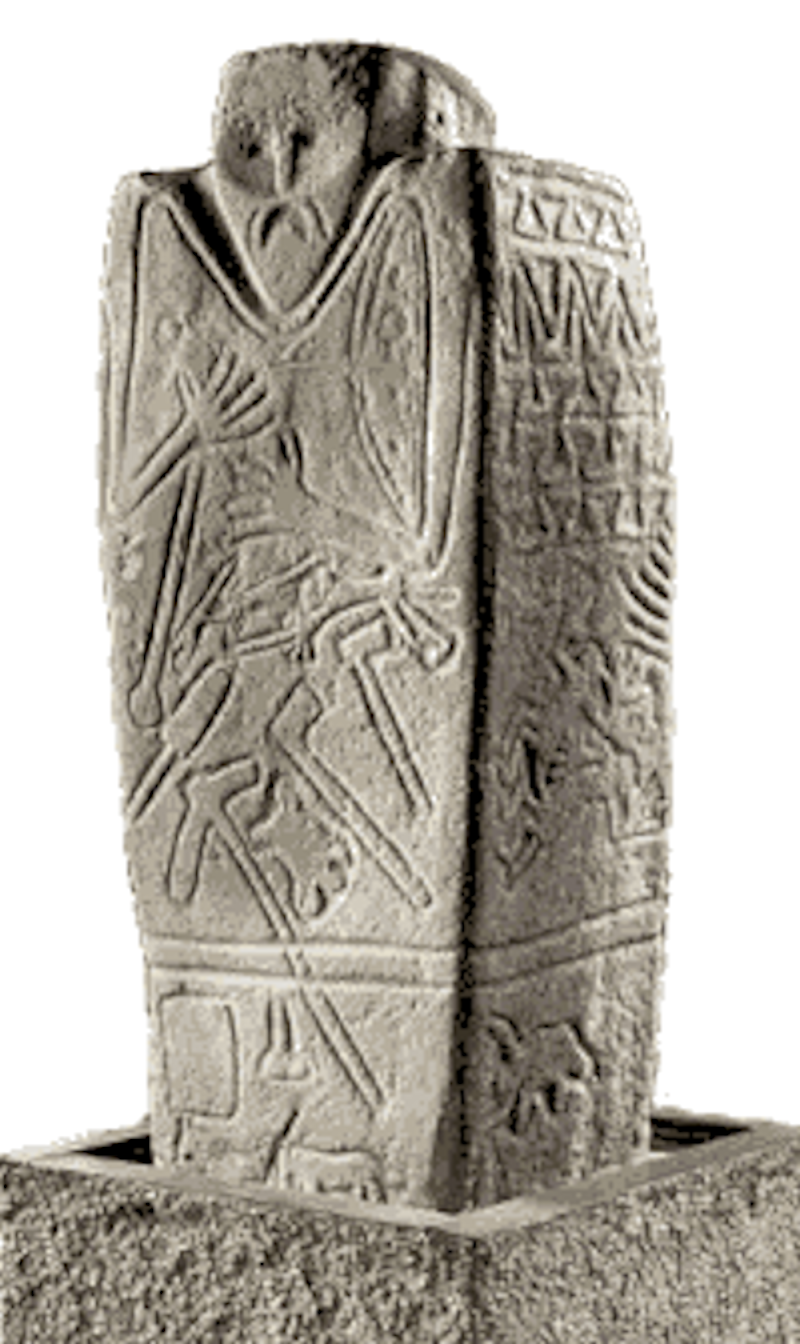
The Kernosivsky idol (late Yamnaya)

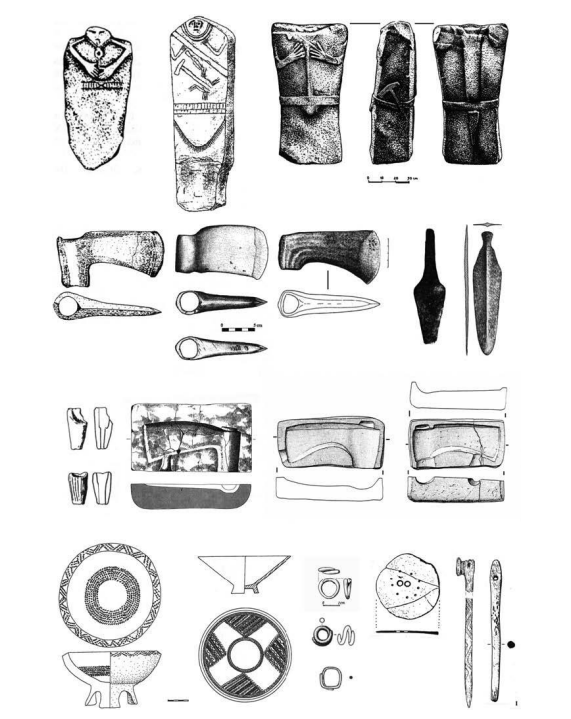
Western Yamnaya artefacts

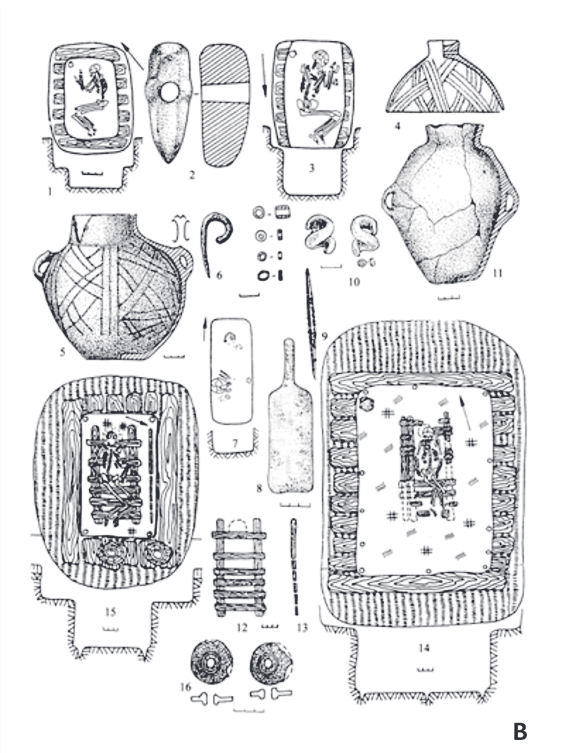
Yamnaya burials from Moldova

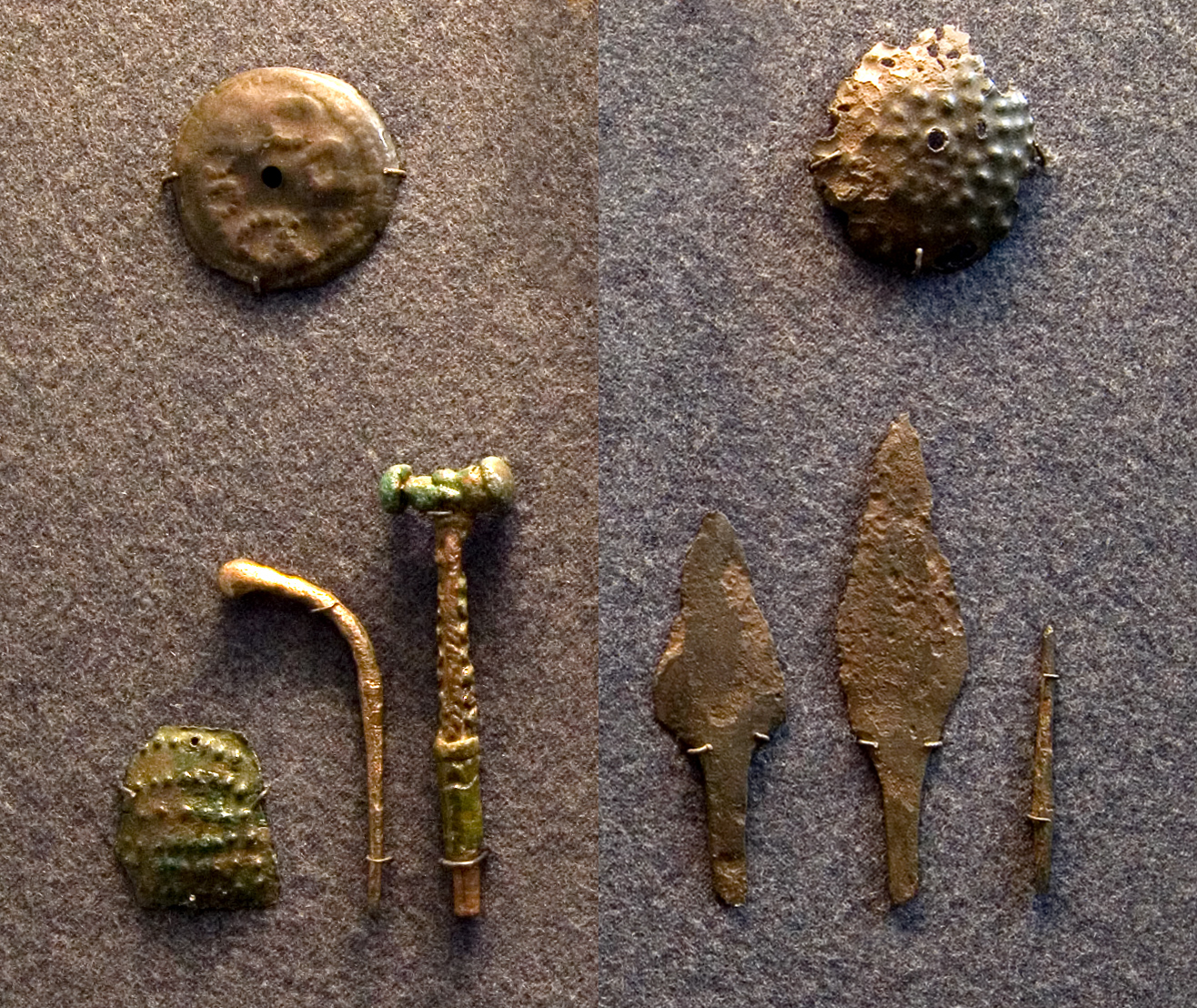
Copper alloy artifacts at the Hermitage Museum

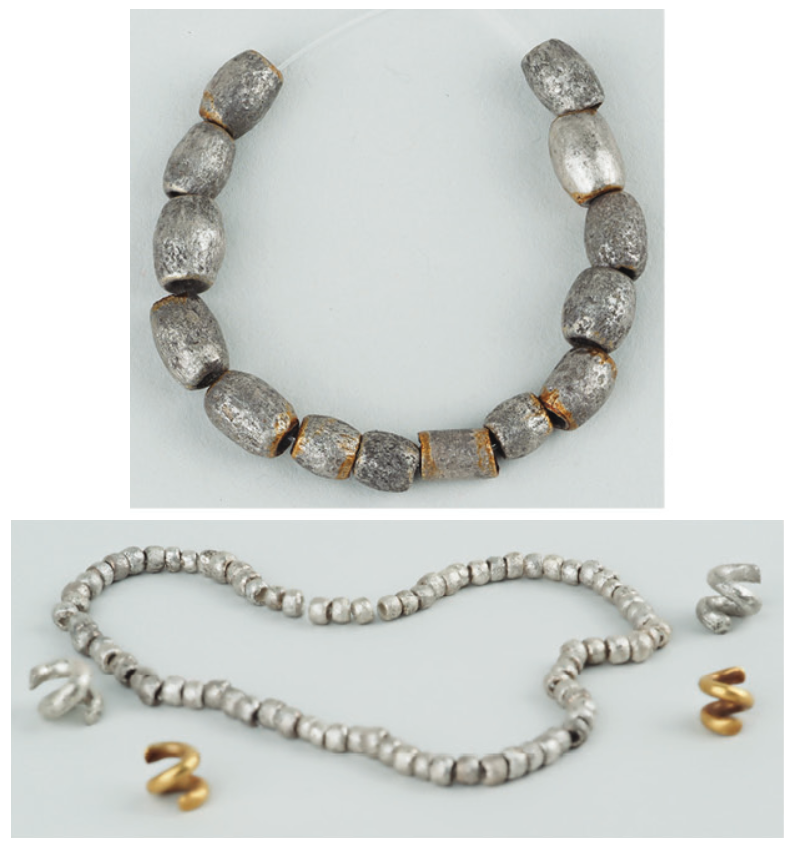
Silver and gold jewellery from Bulgaria

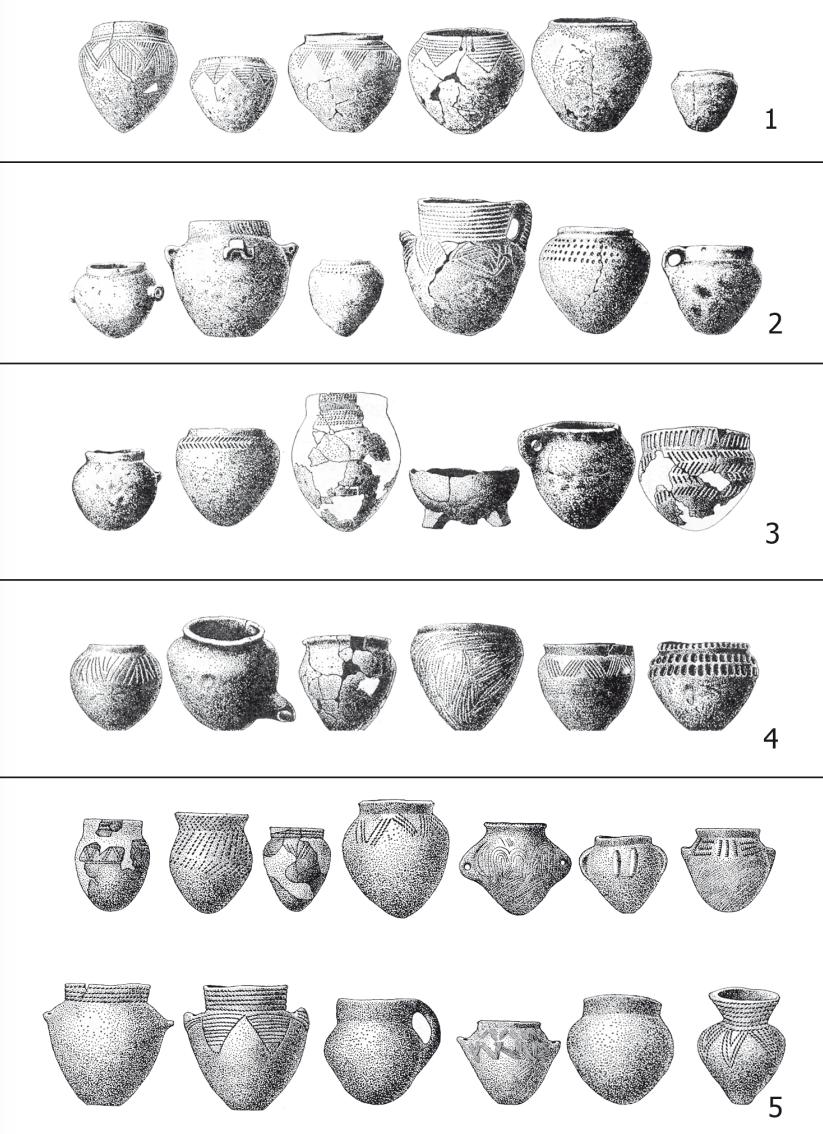
Yamnaya pottery

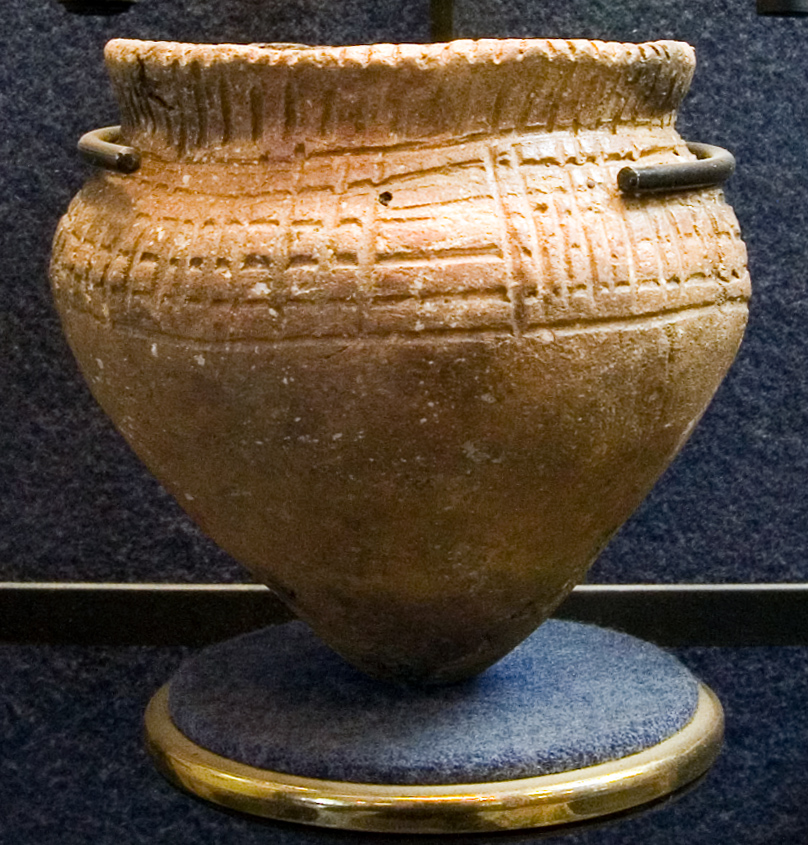
Corded ware vessel

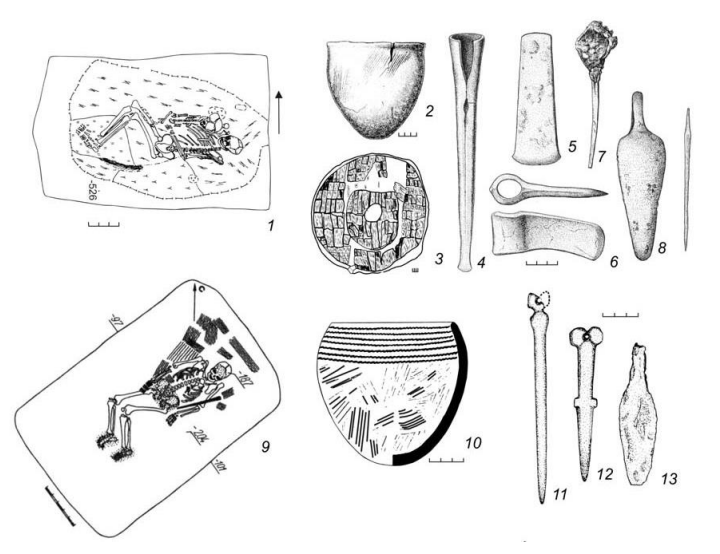
Cis-Ural Yamnaya artefacts and burials

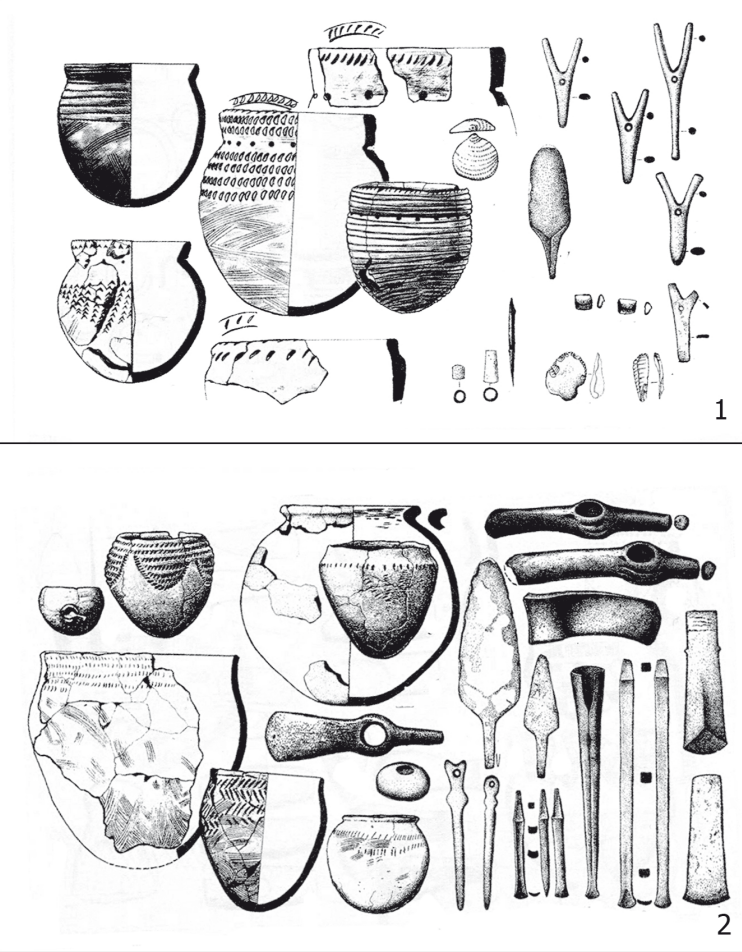
Yamnaya artefacts from the steppe-Urals, early (1) and late (2)

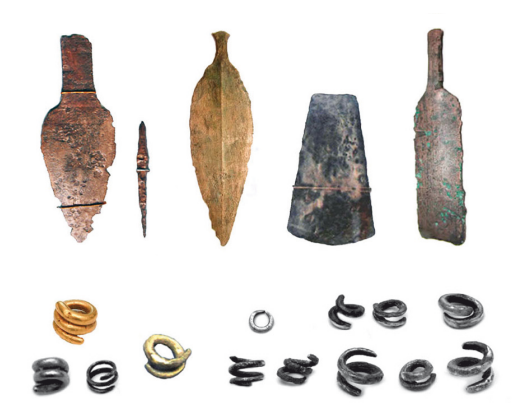
Copper, gold and silver artefacts from western Ukraine

== Archaeogenetics ==
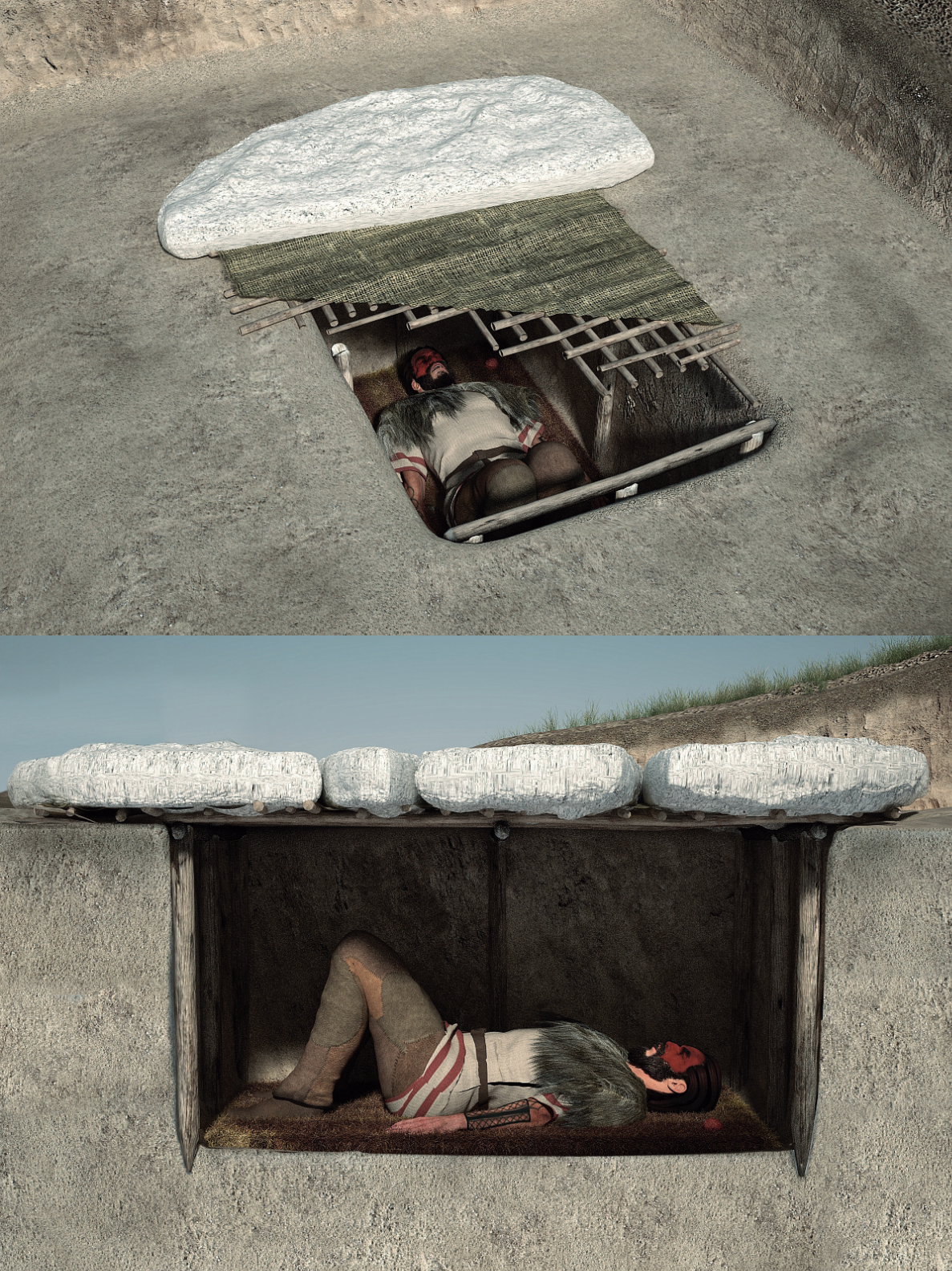
A reconstruction of a Yamnaya burial from Prydnistryanske, Ukraine

According to Jones et al. (2015) and Haak et al. (2015), autosomal tests indicate that the Yamnaya people were the result of a genetic admixture between two different hunter-gatherer populations: distinctive "Eastern Hunter-Gatherers" (EHG), from Eastern Europe, with high affinity to the Mal'ta–Buret' culture or other, closely related people from Siberia and a population of "Caucasus hunter-gatherers" (CHG) who probably arrived from the Caucasus or Iran. Each of those two populations contributed about half the Yamnaya DNA. This admixture is referred to in archaeogenetics as Western Steppe Herder (WSH) ancestry.

Admixture between EHGs and CHGs is believed to have occurred on the eastern Pontic-Caspian steppe starting around 5,000 BC, while admixture with Early European Farmers (EEF) happened in the southern parts of the Pontic-Caspian steppe sometime later. More recent genetic studies have found that the Yamnaya were a mixture of EHGs, CHGs, and to a lesser degree Anatolian farmers and Levantine farmers, but not EEFs from Europe due to lack of WHG DNA in the Yamnaya. This occurred in two distinct admixture events from West Asia into the Pontic-Caspian steppe.

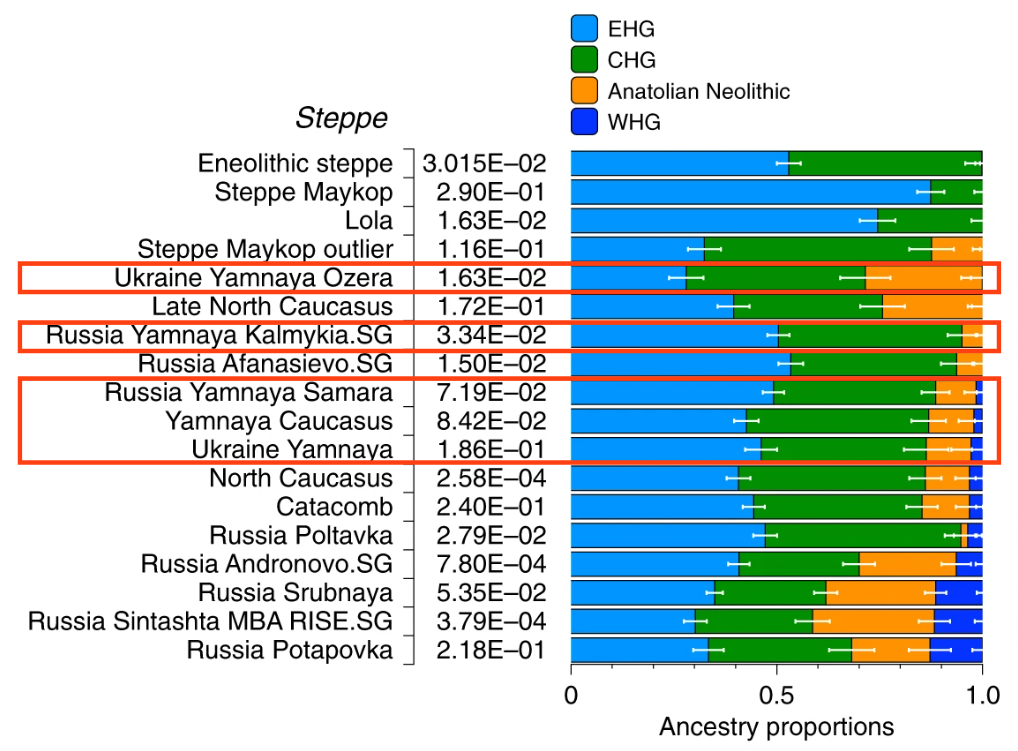
Admixture proportions of Yamnaya populations. They combined Eastern Hunter Gatherer ( EHG), Caucasian Hunter-Gatherer ( CHG), Anatolian Neolithic ( ) and Western Hunter Gatherer ( WHG) ancestry.

Haplogroup R1b, specifically the Z2103 subclade of R1b-L23, is the most common Y-DNA haplogroup found among the Yamnaya specimens. This haplogroup is rare in Western Europe and mainly exists in Southeastern Europe today. A minority are found to belong to haplogroup J2 and I2. They are found to belong to a wider variety of West Eurasian mtDNA haplogroups, including U, T, and haplogroups associated with Caucasus hunter-gatherers and Early European Farmers. A small but significant number of Yamnaya kurgan specimens from Northern Ukraine carried the East Asian mtDNA haplogroup C4.

People of the Yamnaya culture generally had brown eye colour, intermediate skin colour, and dark brown hair colour, with some variation.

Some Yamnaya individuals are believed to have carried a mutation to the KITLG gene associated with blond hair, as several individuals with Steppe ancestry are later found to carry this mutation. The Ancient North Eurasian Afontova Gora group, who contributed significant ancestry to Western Steppe Herders, are believed to be the source of this mutation. A study in 2015 found that Yamnaya had the highest ever calculated genetic selection for height of any of the ancient populations tested. It has been hypothesized that an allele associated with lactase persistence (conferring lactose tolerance into adulthood) was brought to Europe from the steppe by Yamnaya-related migrations.

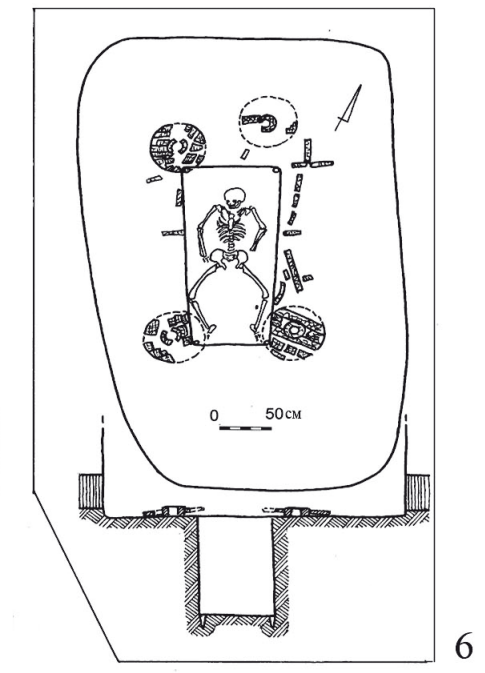
A Yamnaya wagon/cart burial from Novoselytsia, Ukraine

A 2022 study by Lazaridis et al. found that the typical phenotype among the Yamnaya population was brown eyes, brown hair, and intermediate skin colour. None of their Yamnaya samples were predicted to have either blue eyes or blond hair, in contrast with later Steppe groups in Russia and Central Asia, as well as the Bell Beaker culture in Europe, who did carry these phenotypes in significant proportions, after admixture with European farmers.

The geneticist David Reich has argued that the genetic data supports the likelihood that the people of the Yamnaya culture were a "single, genetically coherent group" who were responsible for spreading many Indo-European languages. Reich's group recently suggested that the source of Anatolian and Indo-European subfamilies of the Proto-Indo-European (PIE) language may have been in west Asia and the Yamnaya were responsible for the dissemination of the latter. Reich also argues that the genetic evidence shows that Yamnaya society was an oligarchy dominated by a small number of elite males. Recent (2024 and 2025) publications confirmed the tight clustering of most of Yamnaya genetic profiles, but shifted the origins of PIE towards the Caucasus-Lower Volga (CLV) region.

The genetic evidence for the extent of the role of the Yamnaya culture in the spread of Indo-European languages has been questioned by Russian archaeologist Leo Klejn and Balanovsky et al., who note a lack of male haplogroup continuity between the people of the Yamnaya culture and the contemporary populations of Europe. Klejn has also suggested that the autosomal evidence does not support a Yamnaya migration, arguing that Western Steppe Herder ancestry in both contemporary and Bronze Age samples is lowest around the Danube in Hungary, near the western limits of the Yamnaya culture, and highest in Northern Europe, which Klejn argues is the opposite of what would be expected if the geneticists' hypothesis is correct.

== Language ==
Marija Gimbutas identified the Yamnaya culture with the late Proto-Indo-Europeans (PIE) in her Kurgan hypothesis. In the view of David Anthony, the Pontic-Caspian steppe is the strongest candidate for the Urheimat (original homeland) of the Proto-Indo-European language, citing evidence from linguistics and genetics which suggests that the Yamnaya culture may be the homeland of the Indo-European languages, with the possible exception of the Anatolian languages. On the other hand, Colin Renfrew has argued for a Near Eastern origin of the earliest Indo-European speakers.

According to David W. Anthony, the genetic evidence suggests that the leading clans of the Yamnaya were of EHG (Eastern European hunter-gatherer) and WHG (Western European hunter-gatherer) paternal origin and implies that the Indo-European languages were the result of "a dominant language spoken by EHGs that absorbed Caucasus-like elements in phonology, morphology, and lexicon." It has also been suggested that the PIE language evolved through trade interactions in the circum-Pontic area in the 4th millennium BC, mediated by the Yamnaya predecessors in the North Pontic steppe.

Guus Kroonen et al. 2022 found that the "basal Indo-European stage", also known as Indo-Anatolian or Pre-Proto-Indo-European language, largely but not totally lacked agricultural-related vocabulary and that only the later "core Indo-European languages" saw an increase in agriculture-associated words. According to the researchers, this is consistent with a homeland of early core Indo-European speakers within the westernmost Yamnaya horizon, around and west of the Dnieper; its basal stage, Indo-Anatolian, may have originated in the Sredny Stog culture, as opposed to the eastern Yamnaya horizon. The Corded Ware culture may have acted as a major source for the spread of later Indo-European languages, including Indo-Iranian, and the Tocharian languages may have been mediated via the Catacomb culture.

They also argue that the new data contradict a possible earlier origin of Pre-Proto-Indo-European among agricultural societies south of the Caucasus. Rather, "this may support a scenario of linguistic continuity of local non-mobile herders in the Lower Dnieper region and their genetic persistence after their integration into the successive and expansive Yamnaya horizon". Furthermore, the authors mention that the scenario can explain the difference in paternal haplogroup frequency between the Yamnaya and Corded Ware cultures, although both share similar autosomal DNA ancestry.

== Yamnaya-related migrations ==
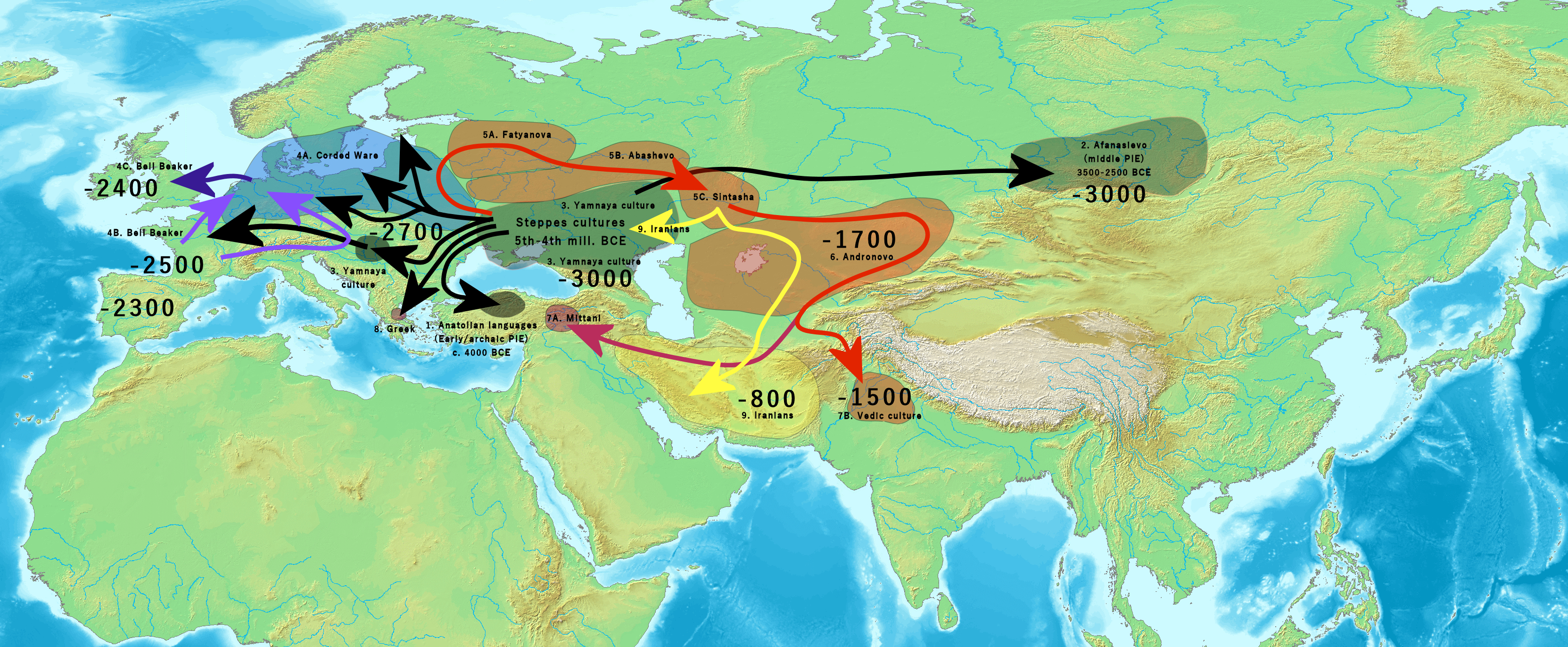
A map of Indo-European dispersals from a Yamnaya-Western Steppe Herders homeland ( ), c. 4000 to 1000 BC, according to the widely held Steppe hypothesis

=== Western Europe ===
Genetic studies have found that Yamnaya autosomal characteristics are very close to the Corded Ware culture people, with up to 75% Yamnaya-like ancestry in the DNA of Corded Ware skeletons from Central and Eastern Europe. Yamnaya–related ancestry is found in the DNA of modern Central, and Northern Europeans (c. 38.8–50.4%), and is also found in lower levels in present-day Southern Europeans (c. 18.5–32.6%), Sardinians (c. 2.4–7.1%), and Sicilians (c. 5.9–11.6%).

However, according to Heyd, et al. (2023), the specific paternal DNA haplogroup that is most commonly found in male Yamnaya specimens cannot be found in modern Western Europeans or in males from the nearby Corded Ware culture. That makes it unlikely that the Corded Ware culture was directly descended from the Yamnaya culture, at least along the paternal line.

Autosomal tests also indicate that the Yamnaya are the vector for "Ancient North Eurasian" admixture into Europe. "Ancient North Eurasian" is the name given in literature to a genetic component that represents descent from the people of the Mal'ta–Buret' culture or a closely related culture. That genetic component is visible in tests of the Yamnaya people, as well as of modern-day Europeans.

=== Eastern Europe and Finland ===
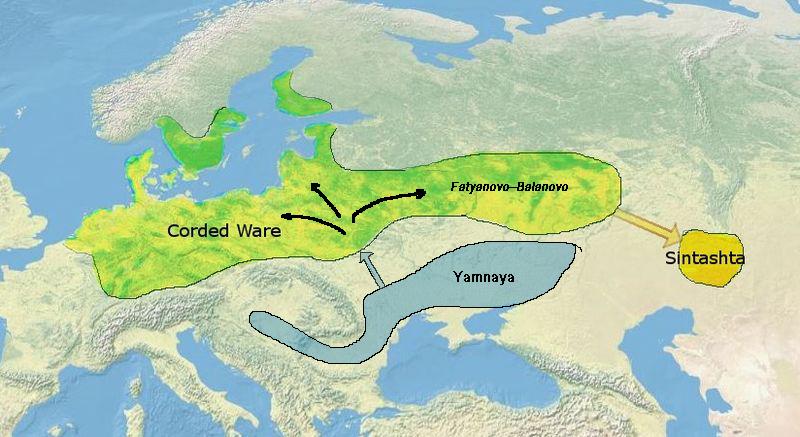
According to Allentoft et al. (2015), the Sintashta culture probably derived from the Corded Ware Culture.

In the Baltic, Jones et al. (2017) found that the Neolithic transition, the passage from a hunter-gatherer economy to a farming-based economy, coincided with the arrival en masse of individuals with Yamnaya-like ancestry. That is different from what happened in Western and Southern Europe, where the Neolithic transition was caused by a population that came from Anatolia, with Pontic steppe ancestry being detected from only the late Neolithic onward.

Per Haak et al. (2015), the Yamnaya contribution in the modern populations of Eastern Europe ranges from 46.8% among Russians to 42.8% in Ukrainians. Finland has the highest Yamnaya contributions in all of Europe (50.4%). (Note: Per Haak et al. (2015), adding a north-Siberian people as a fourth reference population improves residuals for northeastern European populations, accounts for the higher-than-expected Yamnaya contribution and brings it down to expected levels (67.8–50.4 % in Finns, 64.9–46.8 % in Russians).)

=== Central and South Asia ===
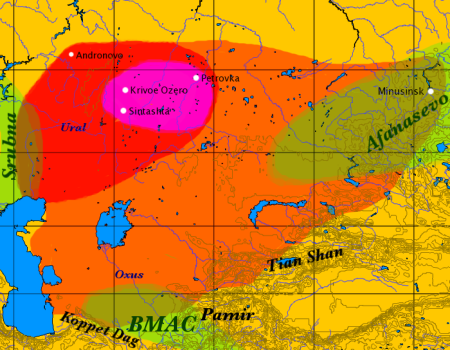
A map of the approximate maximal extent of the Andronovo culture. The formative Sintashta-Petrovka culture is shown in darker red. The location of the earliest spoke-wheeled chariot finds is indicated in purple. Adjacent and overlapping cultures (Afanasevo, Srubna and Bactria-Margiana Culture are shown in green.

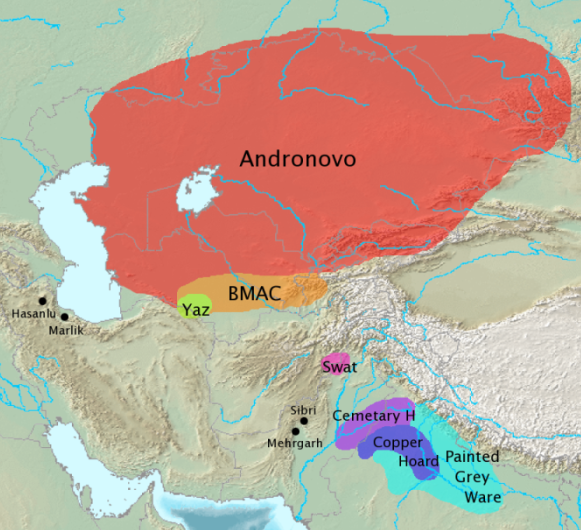
Archaeological cultures associated with Indo-Iranian migrations and Indo-Aryan migrations (after EIEC). The Andronovo, BMAC and Yaz cultures have often been associated with Indo-Iranian migrations. The GGC, Cemetery H, Copper Hoard and PGW cultures are candidates for cultures associated with Indo-Aryan migrations.

There is a significant presence of Yamnaya descent in the nations of South Asia, especially in groups that are referred to as Indo-Aryans. Lazaridis et al. (2016) estimated (6.5–50.2%) steppe-related admixture in South Asians, though the proportion of Steppe ancestry varies widely across ethnic groups. (Note: Lazaridis et al. (2016) Supplementary Information, Table S9.1: "Kalash – 50.2 %, Tiwari Brahmins – 44.1 %, Gujarati (four sample sets) – 46.1 % to 27.5 %, Pathan – 44.6 %, Burusho – 42.5 %, Sindhi – 37.7 %, Punjabi – 32.6 %, Balochi – 32.4 %, Brahui – 30.2 %, Lodhi – 29.3 %, Bengali – 24.6 %, Vishwabhramin – 20.4 %, Makrani – 19.2 %, Mala – 18.4 %, Kusunda – 8.9 %, Kharia – 6.5 %.") According to Pathak et al. (2018), the "North-Western Indian & Pakistani" populations (PNWI) showed significant Middle-Late Bronze Age Steppe (Steppe_MLBA) ancestry along with Yamnaya Early-Middle Bronze Age (Steppe_EMBA) ancestry, but the Indo-Europeans of Gangetic Plains and Dravidian people showed only significant Yamnaya (Steppe_EMBA) ancestry, no Steppe_MLBA. The study also noted that ancient south Asian samples had significantly higher Steppe_MLBA than Steppe_EMBA (or Yamnaya). (Note: Pathak et al. (2018) "The Ror and Jat peoples stand out for having the highest proportion of Steppe_MLBA ancestry (∼63%)")

According to Narasimhan et al. (2019), the Yamnaya-related ancestry, termed Western_Steppe_EMBA, which reached central and south Asia was not the initial expansion from the steppe to the east but a secondary expansion that involved a group with c. 67% Western_Steppe_EMBA ancestry and c. 33% ancestry from the European cline. The group included people similar to that of Corded Ware, Srubnaya, Petrovka and Sintashta.

Moving further eastward in the central steppe, it acquired c. 9% ancestry from a group of people that possessed West Siberian Hunter Gatherer ancestry and thus formed the Central Steppe MLBA cluster. That is the primary source of steppe ancestry in South Asia and contributes up to 30% of the ancestry of the modern groups in the region.

According to Unterländer et al. (2017), all Iron Age Scythian Steppe nomads can best be described as a mixture of Yamnaya-related ancestry and an East Asian–related component, which most closely corresponds to the modern North Siberian Nganasan people of the lower Yenisey River, to varying degrees, but generally higher among Eastern Scythians.

== See also ==
- Kurgan
- Kurgan stelae
- Butmir culture
- Vinča culture
- Beaker culture
- Baden culture
- Botai culture
- Khvalynsk culture
- Mamai-Hora
- Samara culture
- Sintashta culture
- Yersinia pestis
- Proto-Indo-Europeans
