= Mikhailovka culture =

Archeological culture in the Pontic steppe (3600–3000 BCE)

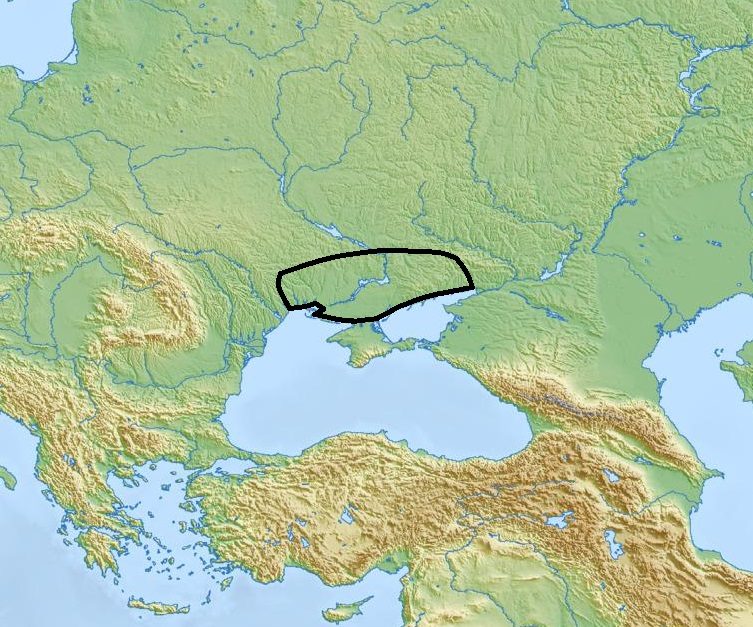
- Period: Eneolithic
- Dates: c. 3600 – 3000 BC
- Followed by: Yamnaya culture

The Mikhailovka culture (Note: Also spelled as Mikhaylovka or Mykhailivka) or Lower Mikhailovka culture (3600—3000 BCE) is a Copper Age archaeological culture which flourished on the Pontic steppe from 3600 BC to 3000 BC.

Lower Mikhailovka culture is named after an early Yamnaya site of the late copper age of the lower Dnieper River, noted for its fortifications, after lower archaeological layer of the site near the village of Mykhaylivka in Kherson Oblast of Ukraine.

Mikhailovka I (3600-3400 BCE) had connections to the west, and is related to the Kemi Oba culture (3700-2200 BCE) at the Bug-Dniepr area and the Crimea, and seems to have had connections to the Maykop culture (3700-3000 BCE).

Mikhailovka II (3400-3000 BCE) had connections to the east, as reflected by its Repin-style pottery. Mikhailovka II is divided into a lower (3400-3300 BCE) and an upper level (3300-3000 BCE). Mikhailovka II shows a shift from farming to cattle herding, typical for the Yamnaya horizon.

The Mikhailovka archaeological site was extensively studied by three expeditions of the Institute of Archaeology, National Academy of Science of Ukraine, led by E.F. Lagodovskaya and O.G. Shaposhnikova, between 1952 and 1963.

The lower horizon of the middle layer of the Mikhailovka archaeological site is dated to 3646-3348 calBCE, while the upper horizon is dated to 3371-3026 calBCE. A tooth specimen from the lower horizon of the middle layer dated to 3635-3383 calBCE has been genetically identified as the earliest specimen of the Core Yamnaya ancestry in the North Pontic.

== Sources ==
- Anthony, David W. (2007), The Horse, the Wheel, and Language: How Bronze-Age Riders from the Eurasian Steppes Shaped the Modern World, Princeton University Press, ISBN 978-0-691-14818-2
- Mallory, J. P. (1997), "Lower Mikhaylovka group", Encyclopedia of Indo-European Culture, Fitzroy Dearborn
