= Khvalynsk culture =

Archaeological culture

Coordinates: 52.741254°N 49.551376°E

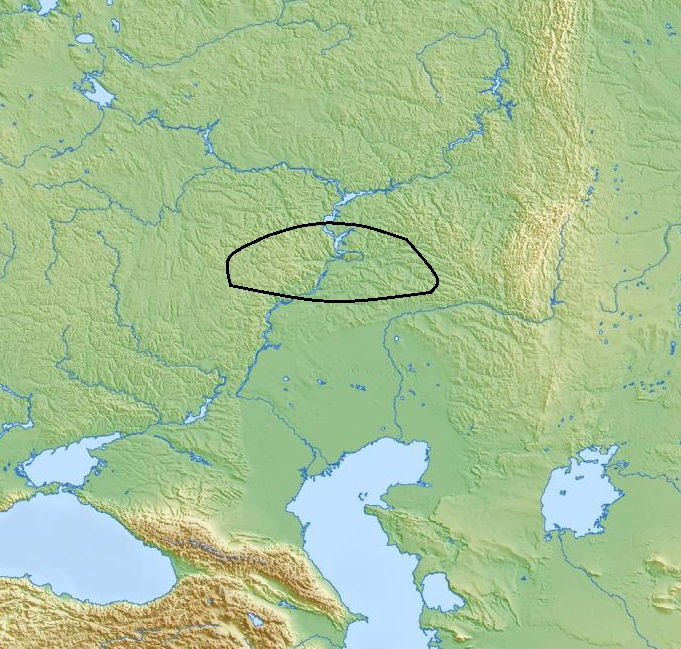
- Geographical range: Europe, Russia
- Period: Eneolithic
- Dates: c. 4900–3500 BCE
- Preceded by: Samara culture
- Followed by: Yamnaya culture

The Khvalynsk culture (Note: /xvɑːˈlɪnsk, kvɑː-/; Russian: Хвалынская культура, pronounced [xvɐˈlɨnskəjə kʊlʲˈturə]) is a Middle Copper Age Eneolithic culture (c. 4900 – 3500 BCE) of the middle Volga region. It takes its name from Khvalynsk in Saratov Oblast. It was preceded by the Early Eneolithic Samara culture.

== Dating ==
A number of calibrated radiocarbon dating readings, which were obtained from material in the graves of the type site, date the culture to approximately 5000–4500 BCE. This material is from Khvalynsk I, or Early Khvalynsk. Khvalynsk II, or Late Khvalynsk, is Late Eneolithic. Asko Parpola regards Khvalynsk culture to be c. 5000 to 3800 BCE.

Nina Morgunova regards Khvalynsk I as Early Eneolithic, contemporary with the second stage of Samara culture called Ivanovka and Toksky stage, which pottery was influenced by Khvalynsk culture, as calibrated period of this second stage of Samara culture is 4850–3640 BCE. Marija Gimbutas believed Samara was earlier, and placed Khvalynsk I in the Developed Eneolithic.

Not enough Samara culture dates and sites exist to settle the question. After c. 4500 BCE, Khvalynsk culture united the lower and middle Volga sites keeping domesticated sheep, goats, cattle, and maybe horses.

== Sites ==
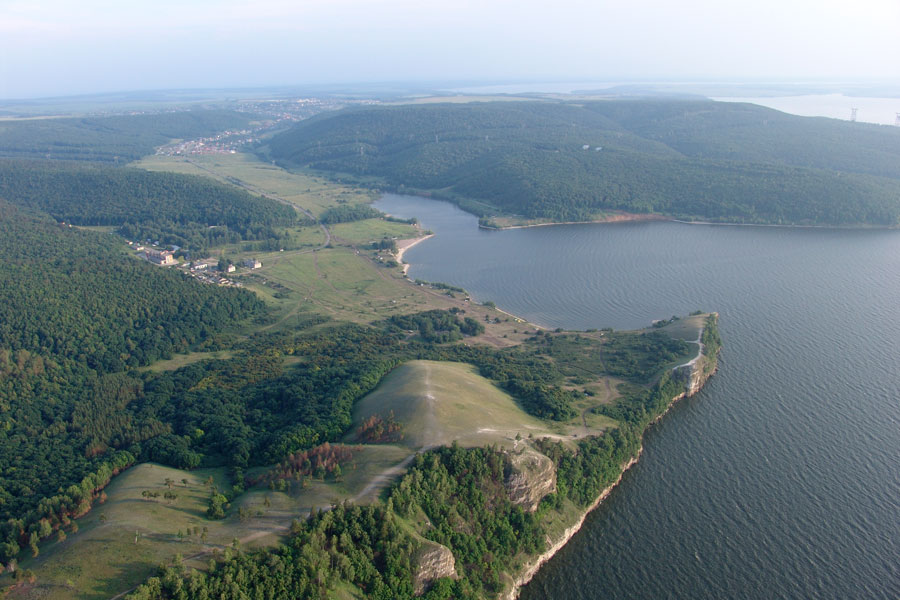
A typical kurgan at the Samara Bend National Park

The Khvalynsk type site is a cemetery, 30 m by 26 m, containing about 158 skeletons, mainly in single graves, but some two to five together. They were buried on their backs with knees contracted. Twelve of the graves were covered with stone cairns. Sacrificial areas were found similar to those at Samara, containing horse, cattle and sheep remains.

An individual grave was found in 1929 at Krivoluchie with grave goods and the remains placed on ochre, face up, knees contracted.

== Artifacts ==
Khvalynsk evidences the further development of the kurgan. It began in the Samara with individual graves or small groups sometimes under stone. In the Khvalynsk culture one finds group graves, which can only be communal on some basis, whether familial or local or both is not clear.

Although there are disparities in the wealth of the grave goods, there seems to be no special marker for the chief. This deficit does not exclude the possibility of a chief. In the later kurgans, one finds that the kurgan is exclusively reserved for a chief and his retinue, with ordinary people excluded.

This development suggests a growing disparity of wealth, which in turn implies a growth in the wealth of the whole community and an increase in population. The explosion of the kurgan culture out of its western steppe homeland must be associated with an expansion of population. The causes of this success and expansion remain obscure.

We do know that metal was available both in the Caucasus and in the southern Urals. The Khvalynsk graves included metal rings and spiral metal rings. However, there is no indication of any use beyond ornamental. The quality of stone weapons and implements reaches a high point. The Krivoluchie grave, which Gimbutas viewed as that of a chief, contained a long flint dagger and tanged arrowheads, all carefully retouched on both faces. In addition there is a porphyry axe-head with lugs and a haft hole. These artifacts are of types that not too long after appeared in metal.

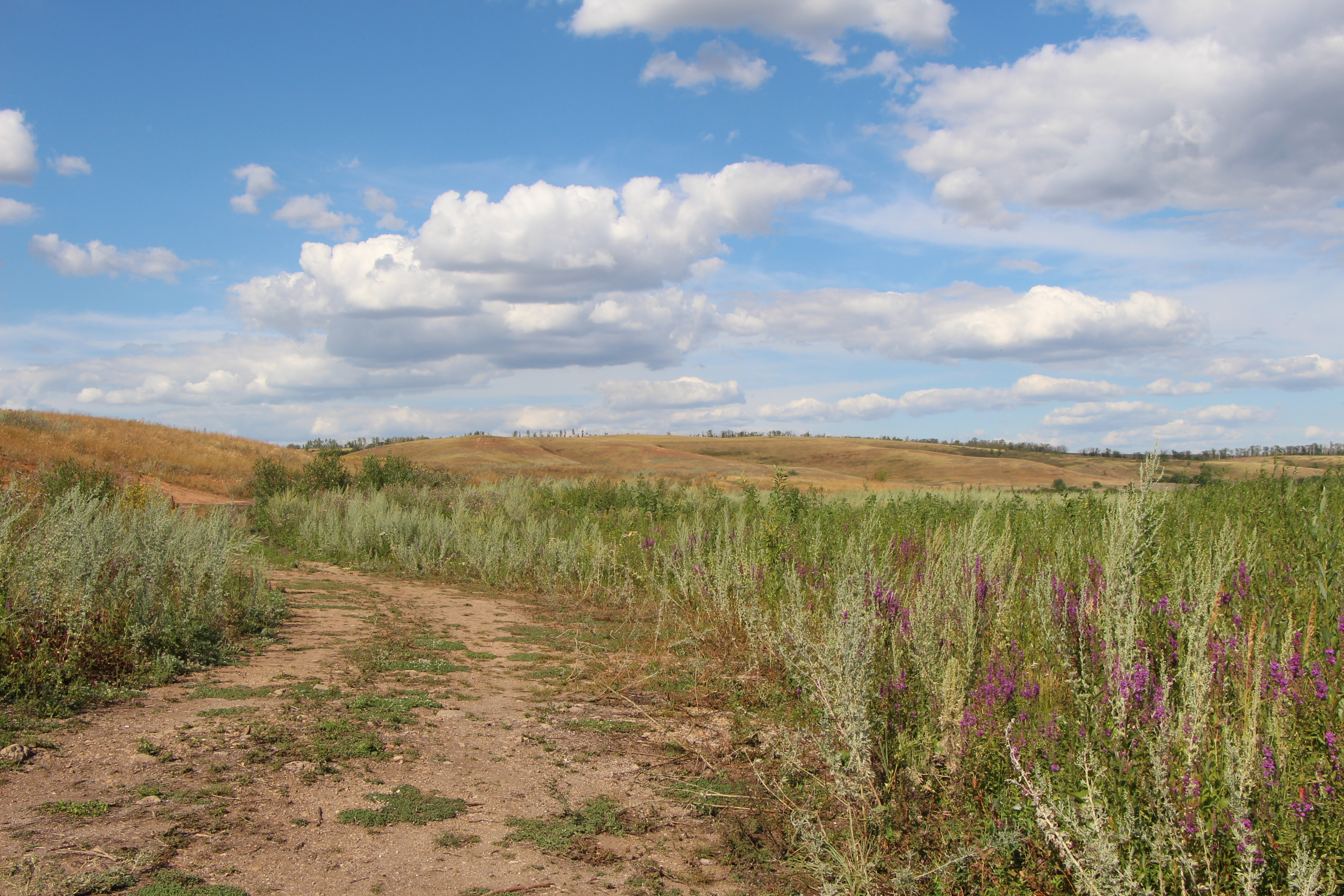
Steppe landscape in the Samara region

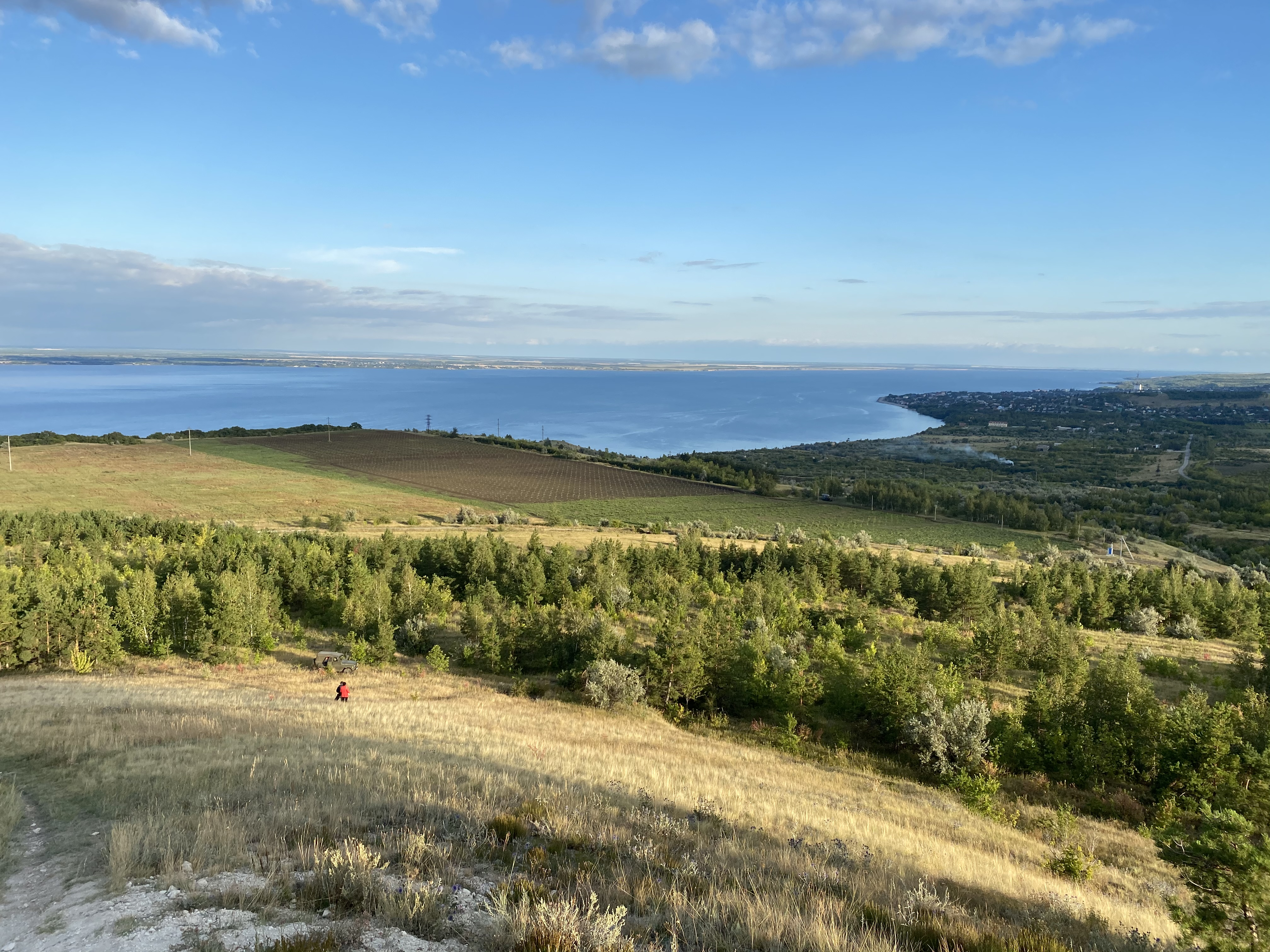
Landscape of the Khvalynsk Hills

There is also plenty of evidence of personal jewelry: beads of shell, stone and animal teeth, bracelets of stone or bone, pendants of boar tusk. The animals whose teeth came to decorate the putative Indo-Europeans are boar, bear, wolf, deer and others. Some of these teeth must have been difficult to acquire, a labor perhaps that led to a value being placed upon them. Whether they were money is not known.

The hard goods leave no record of any great richness. There is some evidence that wealth may have consisted of perishable goods. In fact, in many similar cultures of later times, wealth was reckoned in livestock. A recent study of the surface of the pottery (also of many cultures), which recorded contact with perishable material while the clay was wet, indicates contact with cords and embroidered woven cloth, which the investigators suggest were used to decorate the pot.

== Genetics ==
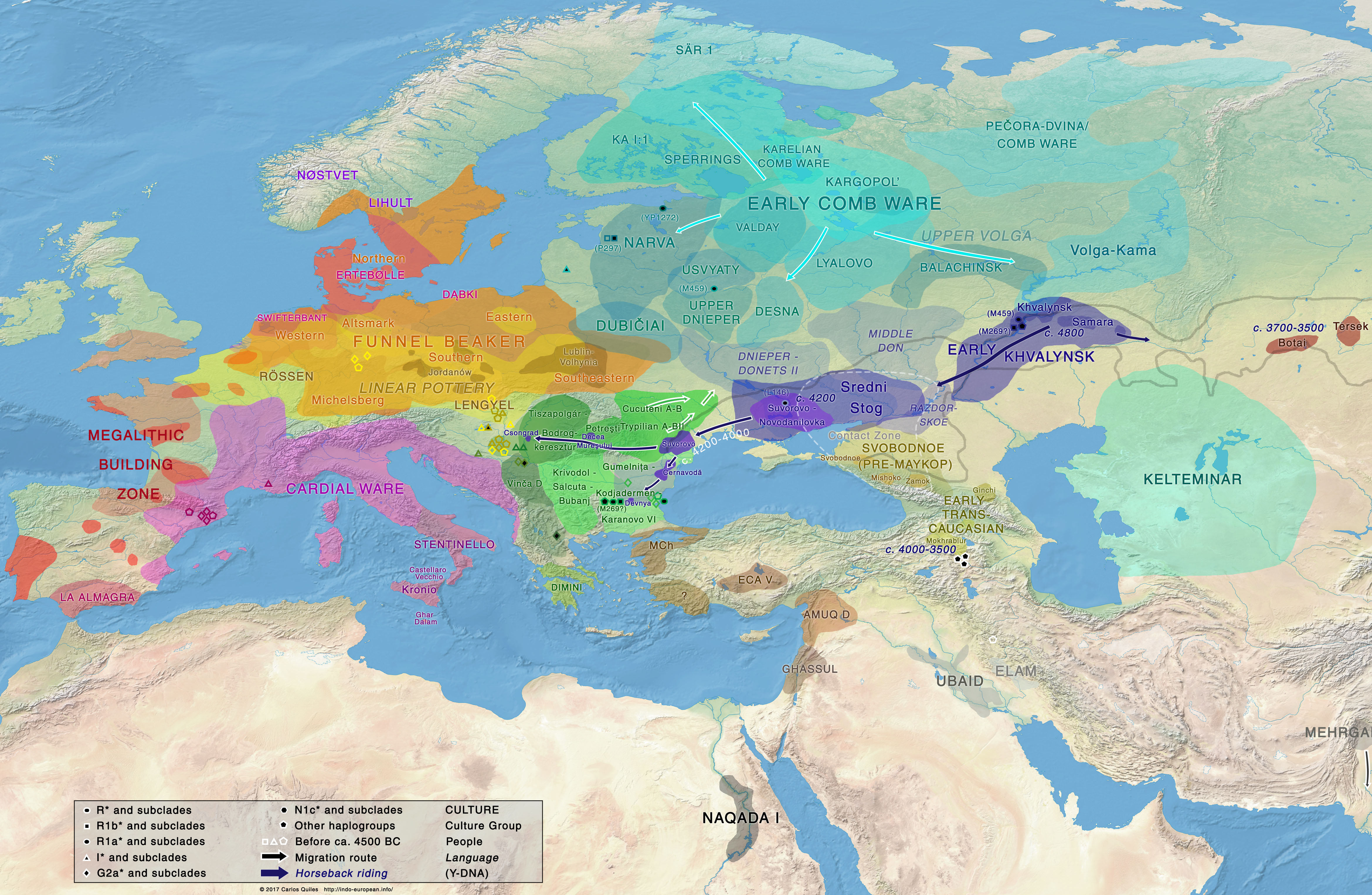
Neolithic migrations c. 5000–4000 BCE. Comb Ware, Sredny Stog and Khvalynsk cultures were found to have a significant EHG component.

Recent genetic studies have shown that males of the Khvalynsk culture carried primarily the paternal haplogroup R1b, although a few samples of R1a, I2a2, Q1a and J have been detected. They belonged to the Western Steppe Herder (WSH) cluster, which is a mixture of Eastern Hunter-Gatherer (EHG) and Caucasus Hunter-Gatherer (CHG) ancestry. This admixture appears to have happened on the eastern Pontic–Caspian steppe starting around 5000 BCE.

Mathieson et al. (2015, 2018) found in three Eneolithic males buried near Khvalynsk between 5200 BCE and 4000 BCE the Y-haplogroups R1b1a and R1a1, and the mt-haplogroups H2a1, U5a1i, and Q1a and a subclade of U4.

A male from the contemporary Sredny Stog culture was found to have 80% WSH ancestry of a similar type to the Khvalynsk people, and 20% Early European Farmer (EEF) ancestry. Among the later Yamnaya culture, males carry exclusively R1b and I2. A similar pattern is observable among males of the earlier Dnieper-Donets culture, who carried only R and I and whose ancestry was exclusively EHG with Western Hunter-Gatherer (WHG) admixture.

The presence of EEF and CHG mtDNA and exclusively EHG and WHG Y-DNA among the Yamnaya and related WSHs suggest that EEF and CHG admixture among them was the result of mixing between EHG and WHG males, and EEF and CHG females. This suggests that the leading clans among the Yamnaya were of EHG paternal origin.

According to David W. Anthony, this implies that the Indo-European languages were the result of "a dominant language spoken by EHGs that absorbed Caucasus-like elements in phonology, morphology, and lexicon" (spoken by CHGs) Other studies have suggested that the Indo-European language family may have originated not in Eastern Europe, but among West Asian (CHG-like) populations south of the Caucasus.

== Physical anthropology ==
A study of cranio-facial morphology of the individuals at the Khvalynsk cemetery (Anthony et al. 2022) indicates that the population was not homogeneous, and comprised two major groups: a 'northern' forest zone population, and a 'southern' lower Don/Caucasus steppe population.

The 'northern' skull morphology is described as robust and broad-faced, with the 'southern' cranial shape more gracile and narrow-faced. The authors argue that the observed heterogeneity of northern and southern cranio-facial types aligns with the aDNA evidence of admixture between two genetically distinct groups.
