= Repin culture =

4th millennium BC Eneolithic archaeological culture in Eastern Europe

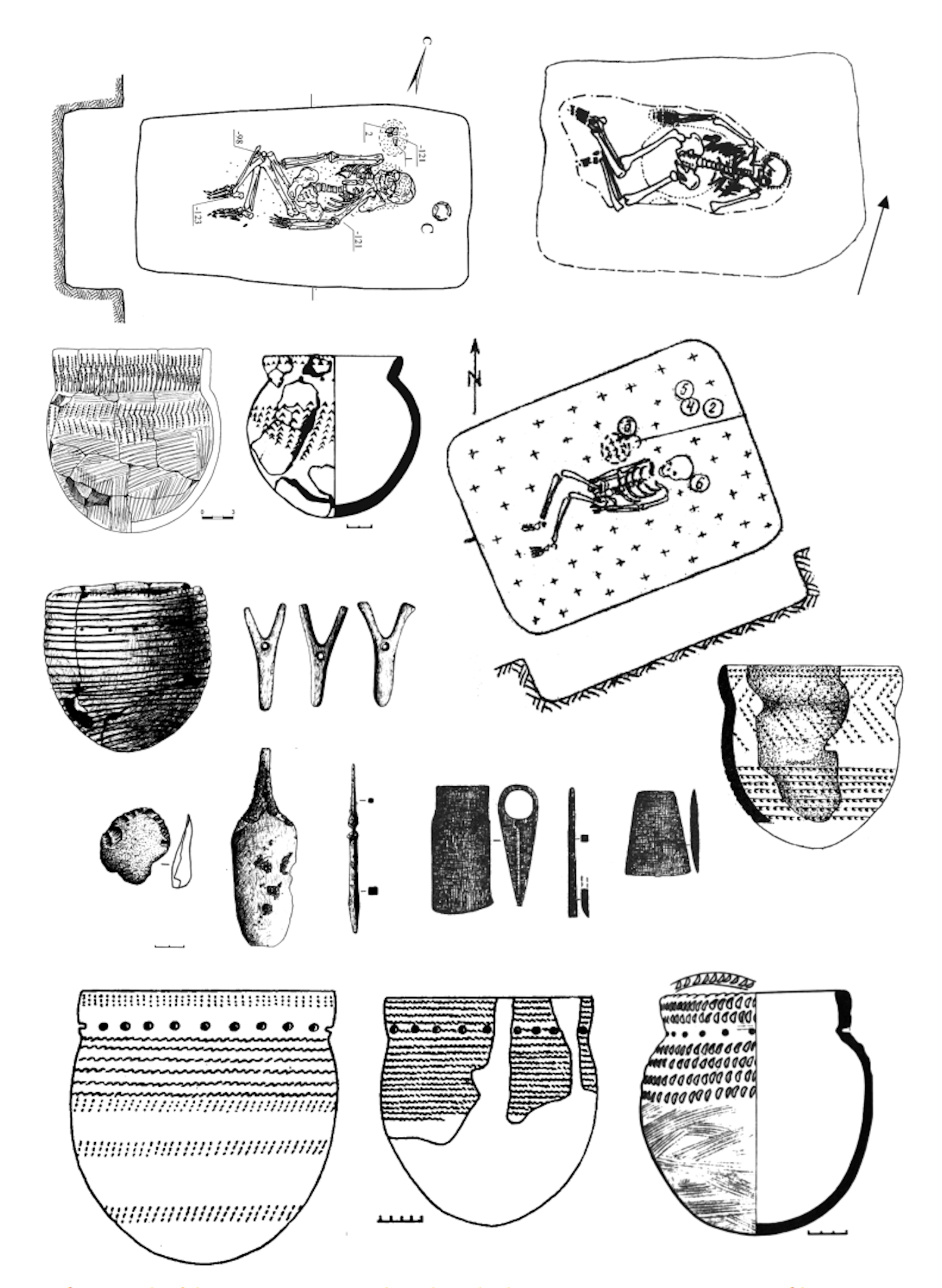
- Materials of the Repin type.
- Geographical range: East European forest steppe and Pontic–Caspian steppe
- Period: Eneolithic
- Dates: 3900–3300 BC
- Type site: Repin
- Major sites: Repin, Kyzyl Khak, Turganik
- Preceded by: Khvalynsk culture, Sredny Stog culture
- Followed by: Yamnaya culture, Afanasievo culture

The Repin culture (sometimes wrongly Repino culture) is a 4th millennium BC Eneolithic archaeological culture of the Pontic–Caspian steppe and East European forest steppe. It developed from preceding local Neolithic cultures, and later developed into the Yamnaya culture. The economy was based on pastoralism, supplemented by hunting. This culture is sometimes classified as an earlier phase of the Yamnaya culture.

== Origins and classification ==
The Repin culture is dated, based on radiocarbon dating of pottery shards, to 3900–3300 calibrated ВС. According to David Anthony, it probably originated in the lower Don region. The Repin culture was bordered by the Deriivka and Kvityana cultures to the west and the Konstantinovka culture to the south.

Some scholars refer to it as the Repin stage of the Yamnaya culture, although others prefer to classify Repin as a distinct Eneolithic culture.

According to A. T. Sinyuk, the Repin culture developed from the preceding local Neolithic cultures. Sinyuk states that the (pre-Corded Ware) Sredny Stog I and Neolithic lower Don cultures are fundamental components in the formation of the Repin culture. Sinyuk and Yuri Rassamakin suggest that the origins of the Repin culture are not connected with the Khvalynsk culture. In contrast, Nina Morgunova and Mikhail Turetskij argue that Cultural continuity between the Yamnaya, Repin, Khvalynsk, and Sredny Stog cultures is demonstrated by the funerary rites and pottery styles.

Rassamakin argues that "there is no longer good support for the simple and attractive idea of a direct evolution of Eneolithic cultures beginning with the Samara and ending with the formation of the Yamnaya culture in the Volga-Ural interfluve. It is no longer accepted by the majority of researchers."

== Sites ==
=== Repin Khutor ===
The type site is called Repin Khutor (in Russian: Репин хутор, or Репих Xутор). The coordinates of Repin Khutor are (according to Kuznetsov-Mochalov 2017): 49°11′29.13″ N, 43°48′05.25″ E. It is located near the location of a former hamlet (khutor) called Repin (in Russian: Репин, or хутор Репин), on the right bank of the middle Don River a few kilometers upstream from its confluence with the Ilovlya River, to the west of another archaeological site, the former village of Zadono-Avilovskiy.

Repin Khutor is located at the edge of the steppe grass. It was excavated in the 1950s. At the site, 55% of the osseous material was horse bones, 18% cattle, 9% sheep or goat, 9% pigs, and 9% red deer. This suggests that horse meat was the most important part of the diet here.

=== Kyzyl Khak ===
A Repin antelope hunters' camp, occupied between c. 3700–3600 BC, situated on the lower Volga. The osseous material here comprises 62% saiga antelope, 13% cattle, 9% sheep, 7% horses, and 7% onagers.

=== Turganik ===
From the Repin horizon at Turganik, Tashlinsky District, 2,000 pottery fragments from over 50 vessels have been excavated. Pottery styles and technology indicate cultural links with contemporary North Caspian and Don cultures. Evidence for metallurgy includes copper ore finds, stone molds for casting copper, tools, and an ornament. Copper was sourced from local copper deposits. Animal bones are mainly domestic animals, including cattle, dogs, and horse, with occasional wild animal bones such as moose, beaver, wild goat, bear, and fox. Fish bones are very rare at this site. The horse finds are considered significant as the region is one of the first places where horse domestication is thought to have occurred.

== Pottery ==
The pottery of the Repin culture is characterised by tall vessels with profiled necks and rounded or flat bottoms, made with silt or a mixture of clay and silt, with some addition of crushed shells and organic material. The surfaces are smoothed and decorated with comb impressions. Vessels are made using molds. The pottery style combines features from nearby regional Eneolithic styles and exhibits technological continuity with other Eneolithic steppe cultures, suggesting cultural integration and mixing that preceded the development of the Yamnaya culture proper.

The ceramic technology of the Repin culture is argued to be evidence of continuity with the earlier Khvalynsk culture.

The repin pottery type is sometimes found in the cultural layer below Yamnaya pottery, and some early Yamnaya pottery is said to be indistinguishable from the repin type. Repin pottery has also been described as very similar to that of Sredny Stog II, while sharing almost no features with that of the Dereivka culture.

== Funerary rites ==
Skeletons are buried in a crouched supine position with bent legs to the left or to the right, with the head in the east, sprinkled with ochre, with multiple burials in flat graves. As the Repin period progresses and expands from the original middle Don region, individual burials under a tumulus, sometimes with cromlechs, become more widespread.

== Economy ==
Livelihood was probably based on a combination of pastoralism and hunting. Evidence from repin sites suggests that animal breeding was the main form of subsistence, with domestic animal bones comprising 80% of the osseous material. The proportion of domesticated species was typical of nomadic pastoralist societies.

David Anthony suggests that the Repin culture may have specialized in horse breeding for export to the north Caucasus region.

Finds demonstrate a relatively advanced regional tradition of metallurgy, based on extracting copper from local Kargaly sandstone, which remained the main source of copper in the later Yamnaya culture.

Rassamakin states that the people of this culture lived a more settled life in the forest-steppe ecotone region, and a more nomadic lifestyle in the steppe zone.

Settlements in the Repin period were of limited number and temporary. Cattle herding gradually became more nomadic over time.

Rassamakin states that the economy of the Repin culture probably resembled that of the Deriivka culture.

== Expansion ==
Anthony suggests that the Afanasievo culture was formed by a migration of people with a material culture of the same type as Repin, probably from the middle Volga-Ural area c. 3700–3500 BC.

During its second phase the Repin culture had expanded to occupy the Volga, Dnieper and lower Don regions. Yuri Rassamakin suggests that the dispersal of the Repin culture to the south, south east, and south west at the end of the Eneolithic contributed to the formation of the Yamnaya culture. Trifonov considers this dispersal to be a colonization. According to Anthony, elements of Repin culture are found over a wide area at sites that precede early Yamnaya settlements.

The Repin culture is regarded by many archaeologists as an early stage of the Yamnaya culture. Viktor Trifonov, for example, states that the development of the Yamnaya culture is simply the expansion of the Repin culture to the steppe. Rassamakin however argues that Repin was only involved in the formation of the Gorodtsov culture, a late local subgroup of Yamnaya.

== Language ==
David Anthony speculates that people of the Repin culture may have spoken a dialect of early Proto-Indo-European. He also proposes that the Afanasievo separation from the Repin culture represents the separation of pre-Tocharian from early Proto-Indo-European.

== Sources ==
- Anthony, David W. (2007). The horse, the wheel, and language : how Bronze-Age riders from the Eurasian steppes shaped the modern world. Princeton, N.J. ISBN 978-1-4008-3110-4. OCLC 496275617.
- Gerling, Claudia (2015). Prehistoric mobility and diet in the west Eurasian steppes 3500 to 300 BC : an isotopic approach. Berlin [Germany]. ISBN 978-3-11-031121-1. OCLC 940511491.
- Levine, Marsha (1999). Late prehistoric exploitation of the Eurasian steppe. Cambridge: McDonald Institute for Archaeological Research. ISBN 1-902937-03-1. OCLC 43563544.
- Morgunova, Nina L. (2015). "Pottery from the Volga area in the Samara and South Urals region from Eneolithic to Early Bronze Age". Documenta Praehistorica. 42. doi:10.4312/dp.42.22. ISSN 1854-2492.
- Morgunova, Nina L (2016). "Archaeological and Natural Scientific Studies of Pit-Grave Culture Barrows in the Volga-Ural Interfluve". Estonian Journal of Archaeology. 20 (2): 128. doi:10.3176/arch.2016.2.02. ISSN 1406-2933.
- Morgunova, N. L. (2020). "Development of ancient cultures and paleoenvironment during the Eneolithic Period and the Early Bronze Age in the Southern Cis-Urals steppe (Russia)". Archaeological and Anthropological Sciences. 12 (10) 241. Bibcode:2020ArAnS..12..241M. doi:10.1007/s12520-020-01197-w. ISSN 1866-9557. S2CID 221885294.
- Heyd, Volker (2013). Transitions to the Bronze Age : interregional interaction and socio-cultural change in the third millennium B.C. Carpathian Basin and neighbouring regions. Budapest. ISBN 978-963-9911-48-2. OCLC 878854403.
- Peterson, D. L. (2006). Beyond the steppe and the sown : proceedings of the 2002 University of Chicago Conference on Eurasian Archaeology. Leiden: Brill. ISBN 978-90-474-0821-5. OCLC 235333195.
- Trifonov, Viktor (1996). "The repin culture and the origin of the yamnaya (pitgrave) culture (abstracts, in Russian)".
