= Corded Ware culture =

European Bronze Age culture

- Geographical range: Europe
- Period: Chalcolithic
- Dates: c. 2900 BC – c. 2300 BC
- Major sites: Bronocice, Vlineves, Gjerrild, Jönsas, Plinkaigalis, Eulau, Bergrheinfeld, Żerniki Górne, Volosovo-Danilovskiy
- Preceded by: Yamnaya culture, Cucuteni-Trypillia culture, Globular Amphora culture, Funnelbeaker culture, Altheim culture, Baden culture, Horgen culture, Volosovo culture, Narva culture, Pit–Comb Ware culture, Pitted Ware culture
- Followed by: Bell Beaker culture, Fatyanovo–Balanovo culture, Abashevo culture, Sintashta culture, Mierzanowice culture,, Trzciniec culture, Únětice culture, Nordic Bronze Age, Single Grave Culture, Komarov culture

The Corded Ware culture comprises a broad archaeological horizon of Europe between c. 2900 BC and 2300 BC, thus from the Late Neolithic, through the Copper Age, and ending in the early Bronze Age.^{:14} Corded Ware culture encompassed a vast area, from the contact zone between the Yamnaya culture and the Corded Ware culture in South Eastern Europe, to the Rhine in the west and the Volga in the east, occupying parts of Northern Europe, Central Europe and Eastern Europe. Autosomal genetic studies suggest that the Corded Ware culture originated from the westward migration of Yamnaya-related people from the steppe-forest zone into the territory of late Neolithic European cultures, evolving in parallel with (although under significant influence from) the Yamnaya; while the idea of direct male-line descent between them has not received significant support yet, IBD-sharing between the populations of these two cultures indicates that, at the very least, they came from a recent common ancestor, with a Harvard Magazine article on the find referring to them as "cousins" who were "biologically separated ... by only a few hundred years".

The Corded Ware culture is considered to be a likely vector for the spread of many of the Indo-European languages in Europe and Asia.

== Nomenclature ==
The term Corded Ware culture (German: Schnurkeramik-Kultur) was first introduced by the German archaeologist Friedrich Klopfleisch in 1883. He named it after cord-like impressions or ornamentation characteristic of its pottery. The term Single Grave culture comes from its burial custom, which consisted of inhumation under tumuli in a crouched position with various artifacts. Battle Axe culture, or Boat Axe culture, is named from its characteristic male grave offering, a stone boat-shaped battle axe.

== Geography ==
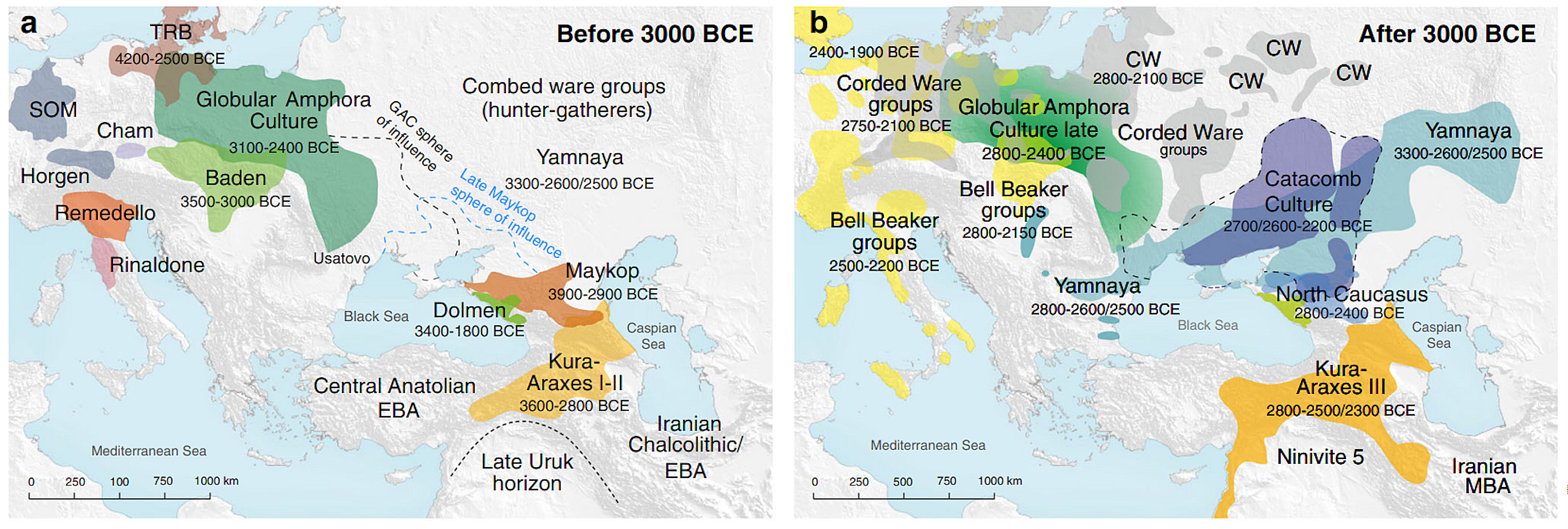
Corded Ware groups (CW, ) and distribution of archaeological cultures in Europe and Caucasus before and after 3000 BC.

Corded Ware, Yamnaya, Baden, and Globular Amphora cultures

Corded Ware encompassed most of continental northern Europe from the Rhine in the west to the Volga in the east, including most of modern-day Germany, the Netherlands, Denmark, Poland, Lithuania, Latvia, Estonia, Belarus, Czech Republic, Austria, Hungary, Slovakia, Switzerland, northwestern Romania, northern Ukraine, and the European part of Russia, as well as coastal Norway and the southern portions of Sweden and Finland. In the Late Eneolithic/Early Bronze Age, it encompassed the territory of nearly the entire Balkan Peninsula, where Corded Ware mixed with other steppe elements.

Archaeologists note that Corded Ware was not a "unified culture", as Corded Ware groups inhabiting a vast geographical area from the Rhine to Volga seem to have regionally specific subsistence strategies and economies. There are differences in the material culture and in settlements and society. At the same time, they had several shared elements that are characteristic of all Corded Ware groups, such as their burial practices, pottery with "cord" decoration and unique stone-axes.

The contemporary Bell Beaker culture overlapped with the western extremity of this culture, west of the Elbe, and may have contributed to the pan-European spread of that culture. Although a similar social organization and settlement pattern to the Beaker were adopted, the Corded Ware group lacked the new refinements made possible through trade and communication by sea and rivers.

=== Origins ===
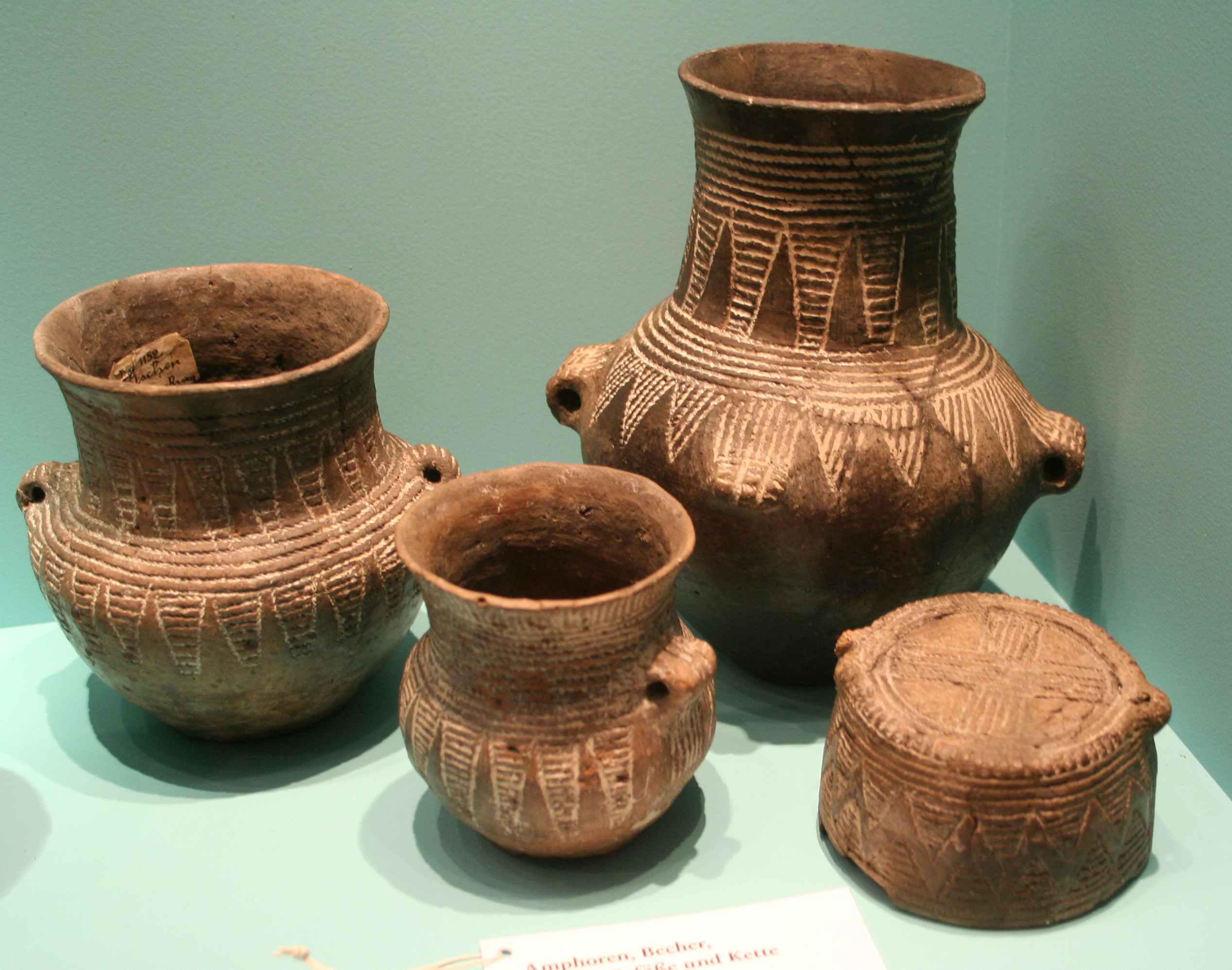
Corded Ware pottery in the Museum für Vor- und Frühgeschichte (Berlin). c. 2500 BC

The origin and dispersal of Corded Ware culture is one of the pivotal unresolved issues of the Indo-European Urheimat problem; there is also a stark division between archaeologists regarding the origins of Corded Ware. The Corded Ware culture has long been regarded as Indo-European, with archaeologists seeing an influence from nomadic pastoral societies of the steppes. Alternatively, some archaeologists believed it developed independently in central Europe.

==== Relation with Yamnaya culture ====
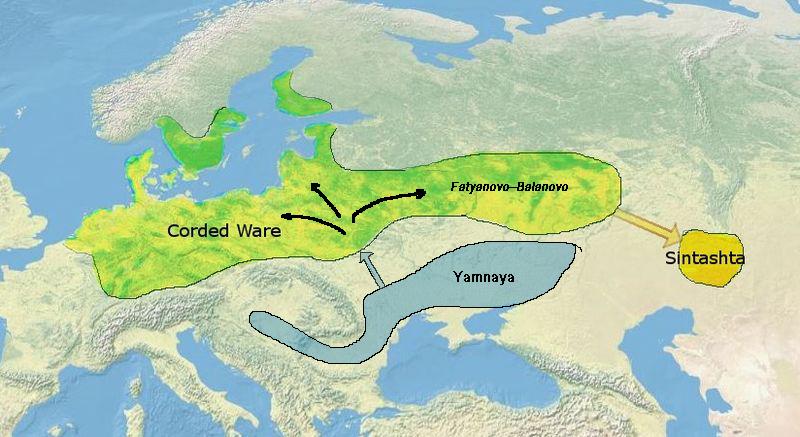
According to Allentoft (2015), the Sintashta culture probably derived at least partially from the Corded Ware culture. Nordqvist and Heyd (2020) confirm this.

The Corded Ware culture was once presumed to be the Urheimat of the Proto-Indo-Europeans based on their possession of the horse and wheeled vehicles, apparent warlike propensities, wide area of distribution and rapid intrusive expansion at the assumed time of the dispersal of Indo-European languages. Today this specific idea has lost currency, as the steppe hypothesis is currently the most widely accepted proposal to explain the origins and spread of the Indo-European languages.

Autosomal genetic studies suggest that the people of the Corded Ware culture share significant levels of ancestry with Yamnaya as a consequence of a "massive migration" from the Pontic-Caspian steppe, and the people of both cultures may be directly descended from a genetically similar pre-Yamnaya population.

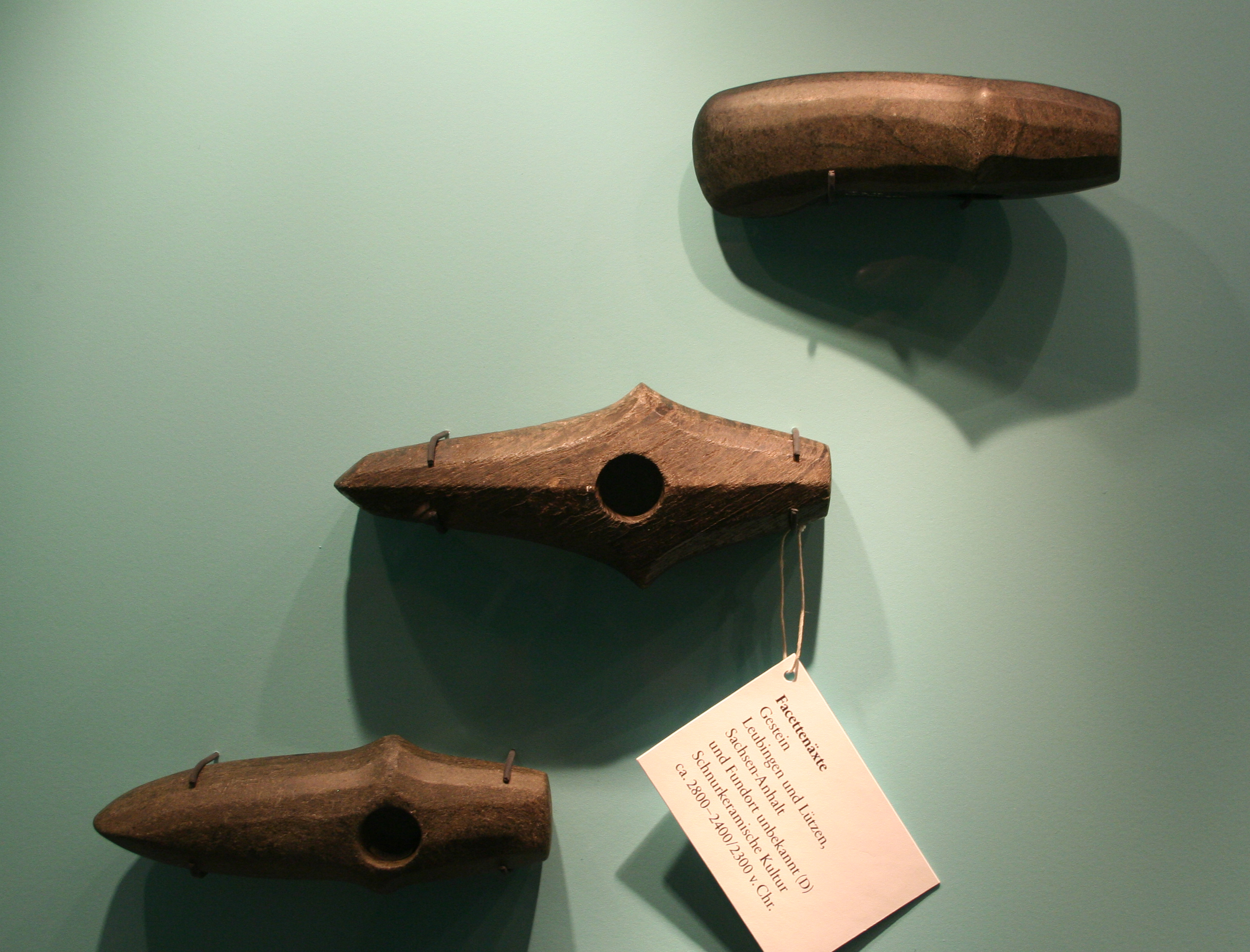
Corded Ware stone-axe in the Museum für Vor- und Frühgeschichte (Berlin). c. 2800–2400 BC.

Kristiansen et al. (2017) theorise that the Corded Ware culture originated from male Yamnaya pastoralists who migrated northward and mated with women from farming communities. (Note: Kristiansen et al. (2017): "We have been able to reconstruct the social processes of cultural integration and hybridisation that followed from (probable) Neolithic women marrying into Yamnaya settlements dominated by males of first-generation migrants.") However, Barry Cunliffe has criticized the theory that the Corded Ware populations were descended from a mass migration of Yamnaya males, noting that the available Corded Ware samples do not carry paternal haplogroups observed in Yamnaya male specimens. This view is shared by Leo Klejn, who maintains that "the Yamnaya cannot be the source of the Corded Ware cultures", as the Corded Ware paternal haplogroups are unrelated to those found in Yamnaya specimens. (Note: Klejn (2017): "Even more remarkable is the variation in the distribution of types of Y chromosome. In the Yamnaya population, R1b is not just a single occurrence (there are about seven known occurrences) while in the Corded Ware population a different clade of R1b is found and R1a is predominant (several instances). Thus the postulate of unbroken succession finds no support!") Similarly, Guus Kroonen et al. (2022), had argued that the Corded Ware populations may have originated from a Yamnaya-related population, rather than the Yamnaya themself, stating that "this may support a scenario of linguistic continuity of local non-mobile herders in the Lower Dnieper region and their genetic persistence after their integration into the successive and expansive Yamnaya horizon".

In 2023, Kristiansen et al. argued that the lack of Yamnaya-related haplogroups in Corded Ware populations indicates that they cannot have been direct male-line descendants of the Yamnaya, as the Corded Ware culture samples were primarily from haplogroup R1a. These authors proposed that the Corded Ware culture evolved in parallel with (although under significant influence from) the Yamnaya, with direct male-line descent between them. However, Papac et al. (2023) revealed the presence of the most commonly sampled Corded Ware haplogroup in the Yamnaya, and Lazaridis et al. (2024) showed the presence of the most commonly sampled Yamnaya haplogroup in the Corded Ware.

Metal complex of the Corded Ware culture (including the Novoselitsk group)

Archaeologists Furholt and Heyd continue to emphasize the differences both between and within the material cultures of these two groups, as well as emphasizing the problems of oversimplifying these long-term social processes.

The Middle Dnieper culture forms a bridge between the Yamnaya culture and the Corded Ware culture. From the Middle Dnieper culture the Corded Ware culture spread both west and east. The eastward migration gave rise to the Fatyanova culture which had a formative influence on the Abashevo culture, which in turn contributed to the proto-Indo-Iranian Sintashta culture. Its wide area of distribution indicates rapid expansion at the assumed time of the dispersal of the core (excluding Anatolian and Tocharian) Indo-European languages. In a number of regions Corded Ware appears to herald a new culture and physical type. On most of the immense, continental expanse that it covered, the culture was clearly intrusive, and therefore represents one of the most impressive and revolutionary cultural changes attested by archaeology.

Early Corded Ware metallurgy is thought to have developed from the earlier copper metallurgy of the Cucuteni-Trypillia culture (extending from Romania, Moldova and Ukraine) with some additional Eastern Mediterranean influences.

==== Independent development ====
In favour of the view that the culture developed independently was that Corded Ware coincides considerably with the earlier north-central European Funnelbeaker culture (TRB). According to Gimbutas, the Corded Ware culture was preceded by the Globular Amphora culture (3400–2800 BC), which she regarded to be an Indo-European culture. The Globular Amphora culture stretched from central Europe to the Baltic sea, and emerged from the Funnelbeaker culture.

According to controversial radiocarbon dates, Corded Ware ceramic forms in single graves develop earlier in the area that is now Poland than in western and southern Central Europe. The earliest radiocarbon dates for Corded Ware indeed come from Kujawy and Lesser Poland in central and southern Poland and point to the period around 3000 BC.

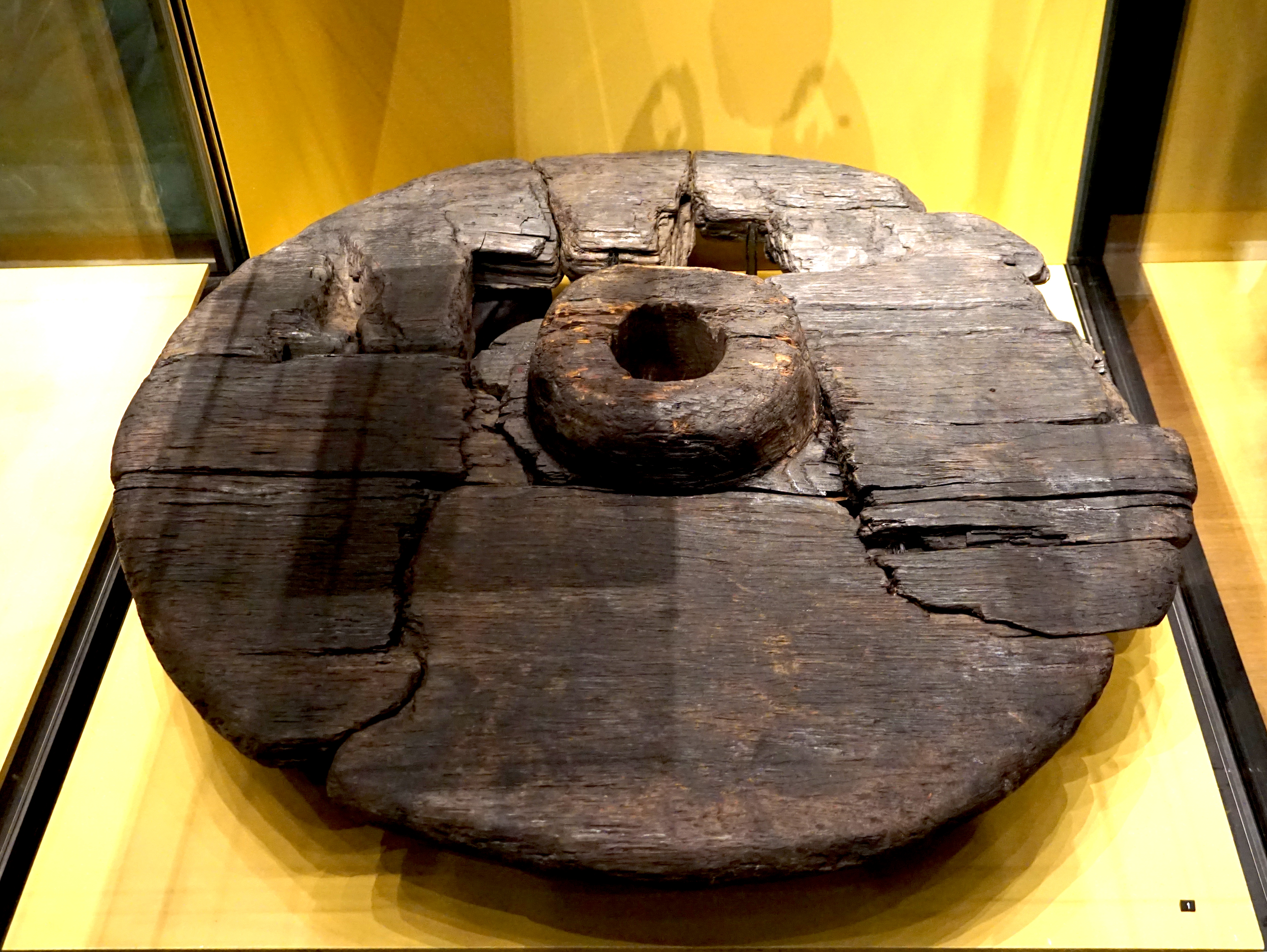
Wagon wheel from Ubbena, Netherlands, c. 2900-2580 BC, Single Grave culture

However, subsequent review has challenged this perspective, instead pointing out that the wide variation in dating of the Corded Ware, especially the dating of the culture's beginning, is based on individual outlier graves, is not particularly in line with other archaeological data and runs afoul of plateaus in the radiocarbon calibration curve; in the one case where the dating can be clarified with dendrochronology, in Switzerland, Corded Ware is found for only a short period from 2750 BC to 2400 BC. Furthermore, because the short period in Switzerland seems to represent examples of artifacts from all the major sub-periods of the Corded Ware culture elsewhere, some researchers conclude that Corded Ware appeared more or less simultaneously throughout North Central Europe approximately in the early 29th century BC (around 2900 BC), in a number of "centers" which subsequently formed their own local networks. Carbon-14 dating of the remaining central European regions shows that Corded Ware appeared after 2880 BC. According to this theory, it spread to the Lüneburg Heath and then further to the North European Plain, Rhineland, Switzerland, Scandinavia, the Baltic region and Russia to Moscow, where the culture met with the pastoralists considered indigenous to the steppes.

=== Subgroups ===
==== Middle Dnieper culture ====
The Middle Dnieper culture is a formative early expression of the Corded Ware culture. It has very scant remains, but occupies the easiest route into Central and Northern Europe from the steppe.

==== Fatyanovo–Balanovo culture ====
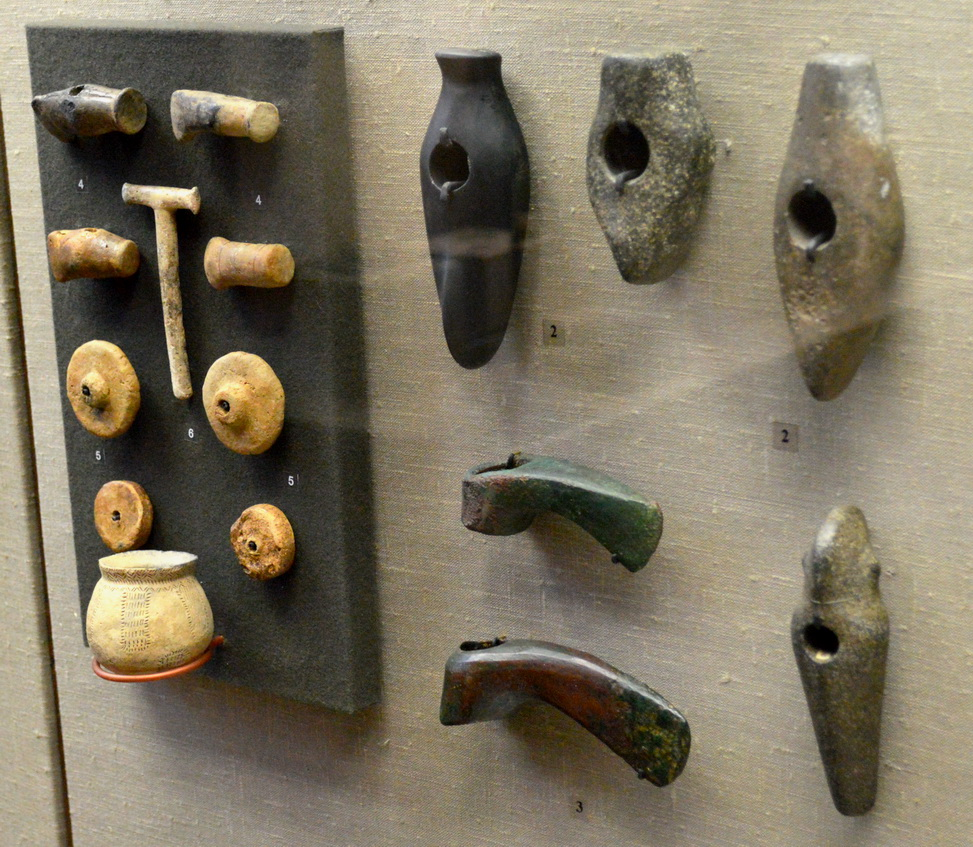
Fatyanovo–Balanovo artefacts including bronze axes

The Middle Dnieper culture and the Eastern Baltic Corded Ware culture gave rise to the Fatyanovo–Balanovo culture on the upper Volga, which in turn contributed to the Abashevo culture, a predecessor of the proto-Indo-Iranian Sintashta culture.

The Fatyanovo–Balanovo culture may have been a culture with an Indo-European superstratum over a Uralic substratum, and may account for some of the linguistic borrowings identified in the Indo-Uralic thesis. However, according to Häkkinen, the Uralic–Indo-European contacts only start in the Corded Ware period and the Uralic expansion into the Upper Volga region postdates it. Häkkinen accepts Fatyanovo-Balanovo as an early Indo-European culture, but maintains that their substratum (identified with the Volosovo culture) was neither Uralic nor Indo-European.

==== Schnurkeramikkultur ====
The prototypical Corded Ware culture (German: Schnurkeramikkultur) is found in Central Europe, mainly Germany and Poland, and refers to the characteristic pottery of the era: twisted cord was impressed into the wet clay to create various decorative patterns and motifs. It is known mostly from its burials, and both sexes received the characteristic cord-decorated pottery. Whether made of flax or hemp, they had rope.

==== Single Grave culture ====
Reconstruction of a large building at Zeewijk, Netherlands, Single Grave culture

'Single Grave' refers to a series of late Neolithic communities of the 3rd millennium BC living in southern Scandinavia, Northern Germany, and the Low Countries that share the practice of single burial, the deceased usually being accompanied by a battle-axe, amber beads, and pottery vessels.

The term Single Grave culture was first introduced by the Danish archaeologist Andreas Peter Madsen in the late 1800s. He found Single Graves to be quite different from the already known dolmens, long barrows and passage graves. In 1898, archaeologist Sophus Müller was first to present a migration-hypothesis stating that previously known dolmens, long barrows, passage graves and newly discovered single graves may represent two completely different groups of people, stating "Single graves are traces of new, from the south coming tribes".

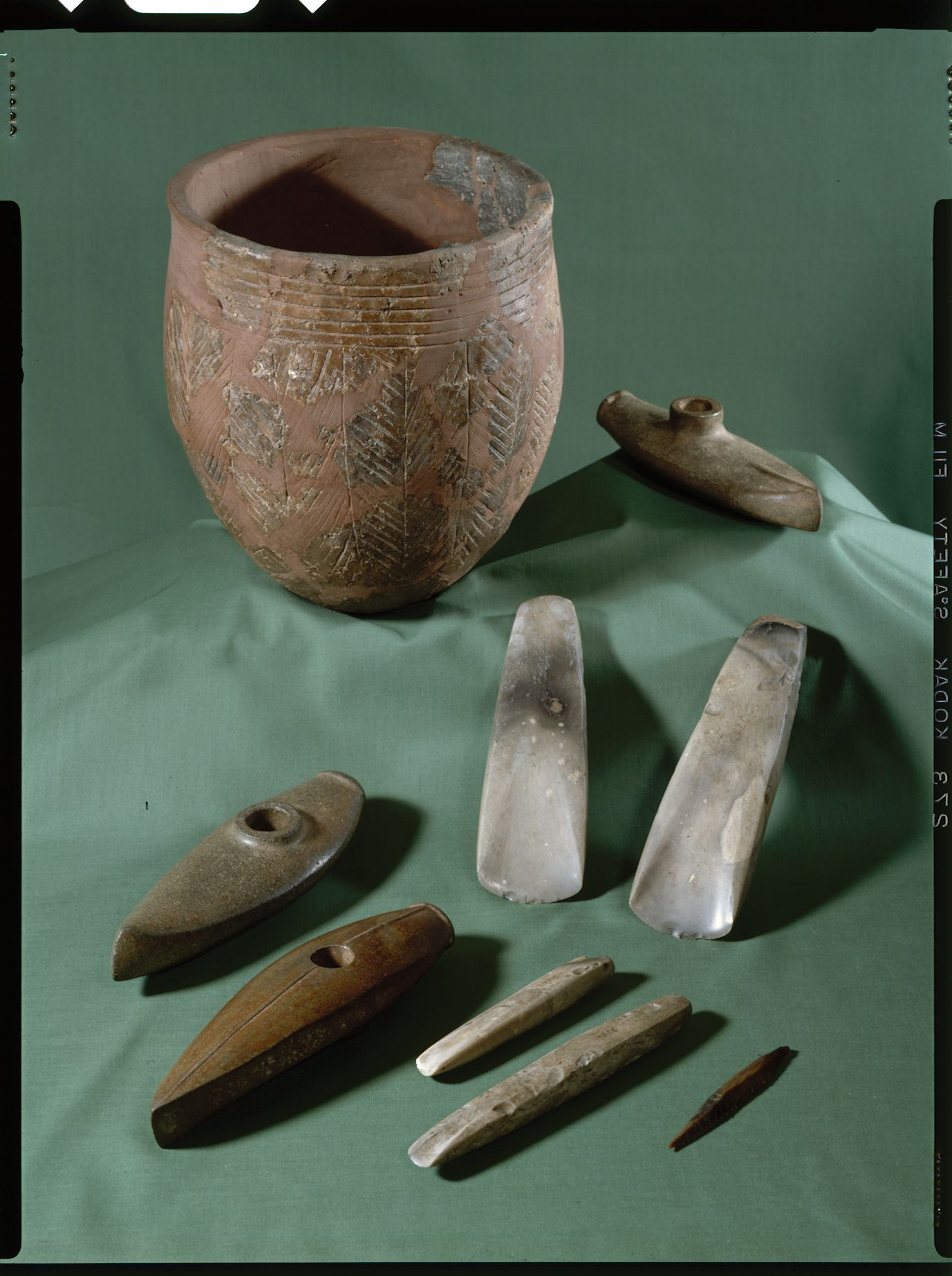
Single Grave artefacts, National Museum of Denmark

The cultural emphasis on drinking equipment already characteristic of the early indigenous Funnelbeaker culture, synthesized with newly arrived Corded Ware traditions. Especially in the west (Scandinavia and northern Germany), the drinking vessels have a protruding foot and define the Protruding-Foot Beaker culture (PFB) as a subset of the Single Grave culture. The Beaker culture has been proposed to derive from this specific branch of the Corded Ware culture.

At Zeewijk in the Netherlands the remains of a large rectangular building measuring 22 by 5.5–7 m (72 by 18–23 ft), have been excavated. The building may have had a ritual or ceremonial function.

==== Scandinavian Battle Axe culture ====
The Danish-Swedish-Norwegian Battle Axe culture, or the Boat Axe culture, appeared c. 2800 BC and is known from about 3,000 graves from Scania to Uppland and Trøndelag. The "battle-axes" were primarily a status object. There are strong continuities in stone craft traditions, and very little evidence of any type of full-scale migration, least of all a violent one. The old ways were discontinued as the corresponding cultures on the continent changed, and the farmers living in Scandinavia took part in a few of those changes since they belonged to the same network. Settlements on small, separate farmsteads without any defensive protection is also a strong argument against the people living there being aggressors.

About 3000 battle axes have been found, in sites distributed over all of Scandinavia, but they are sparse in Norrland and northern Norway. Less than 100 settlements are known, and their remains are negligible as they are located on continually used farmland, and have consequently been plowed away. Einar Østmo reports sites inside the Arctic Circle in the Lofoten, and as far north as the present city of Tromsø.

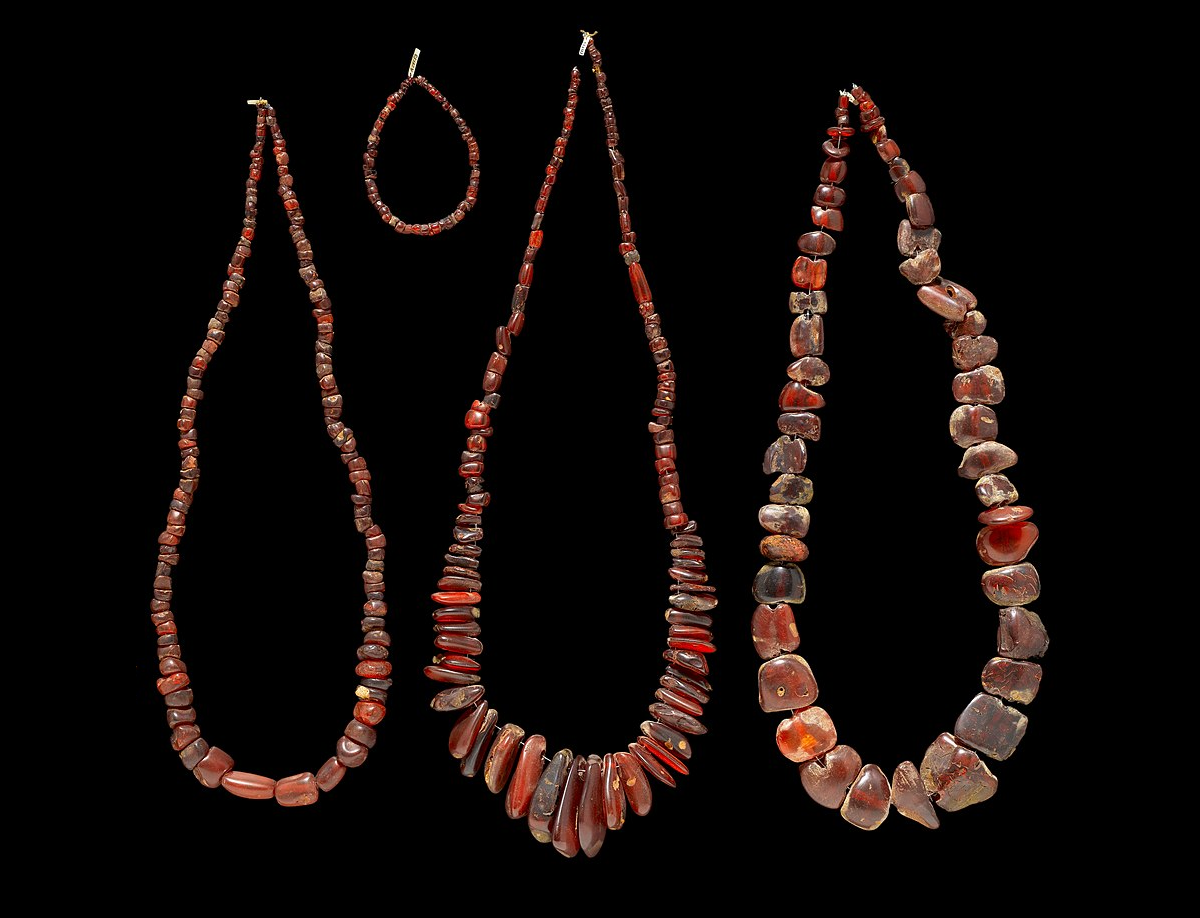
Amber necklaces, Denmark

The Swedish-Norwegian Battle Axe culture was based on the same agricultural practices as the previous Funnelbeaker culture, but the appearance of metal changed the social system. This is marked by the fact that the Funnelbeaker culture had collective megalithic graves with a great deal of sacrifices to the graves, but the Battle Axe culture has individual graves with individual sacrifices.

A new aspect was given to the culture in 1993, when a death house in Turinge, in Södermanland, was excavated. Along the once heavily timbered walls were found the remains of about twenty clay vessels, six work axes and a battle axe, which all came from the last period of the culture. There were also the cremated remains of at least six people. This is the earliest find of cremation in Scandinavia and it shows close contacts with Central Europe.

In the context of the entry of Germanic into the region, Einar Østmo emphasizes that the Atlantic and North Sea coastal regions of Scandinavia, and the circum-Baltic areas were united by a vigorous maritime economy, permitting a far wider geographical spread and a closer cultural unity than interior continental cultures could attain. He points to the widely disseminated number of rock carvings assigned to this era, which display "thousands" of ships. To seafaring cultures like this one, the sea is a highway and not a divider.

==== Finnish Battle Axe culture ====
The Finnish Battle Axe culture was a mixed cattle-breeder and hunter-gatherer culture, and one of the few in this horizon to provide rich finds from settlements.

== Economy ==
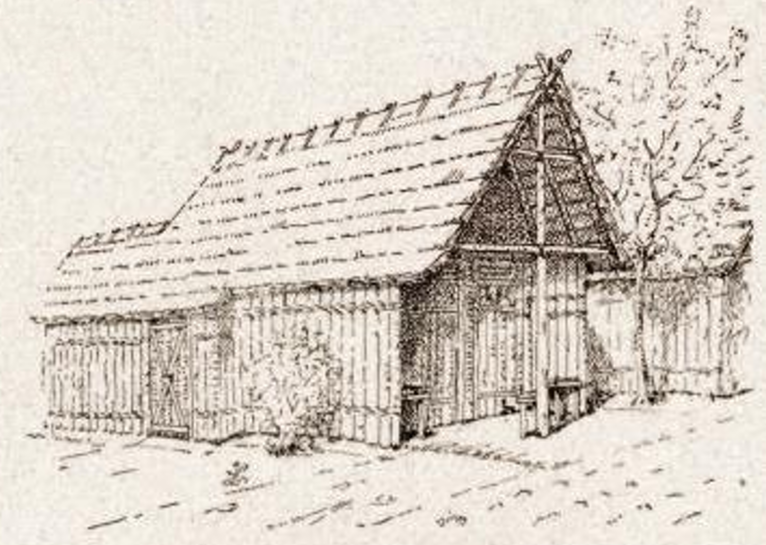
Reconstruction of a Corded Ware house in Suchacz, Poland

There are very few discovered settlements, which led to the traditional view of this culture as exclusively nomadic pastoralists, similar to that of the Yamnaya culture, and the reconstructed culture of the Indo-Europeans as inferred from philology.

However, this view was modified, as some evidence of sedentary farming emerged. Traces of emmer, common wheat and barley were found at a Corded Ware site at Bronocice in south-east Poland. Wheeled vehicles (presumably drawn by oxen) are in evidence, a continuation from the Funnelbeaker culture era.

Cows' milk was used systematically from 3400 BC onwards in the northern Alpine foreland. Sheep were kept more frequently in the western part of Switzerland due to the stronger Mediterranean influence. Changes in slaughter age and animal size are possibly evidence for sheep being kept for their wool at Corded Ware sites in this region.

== Graves ==
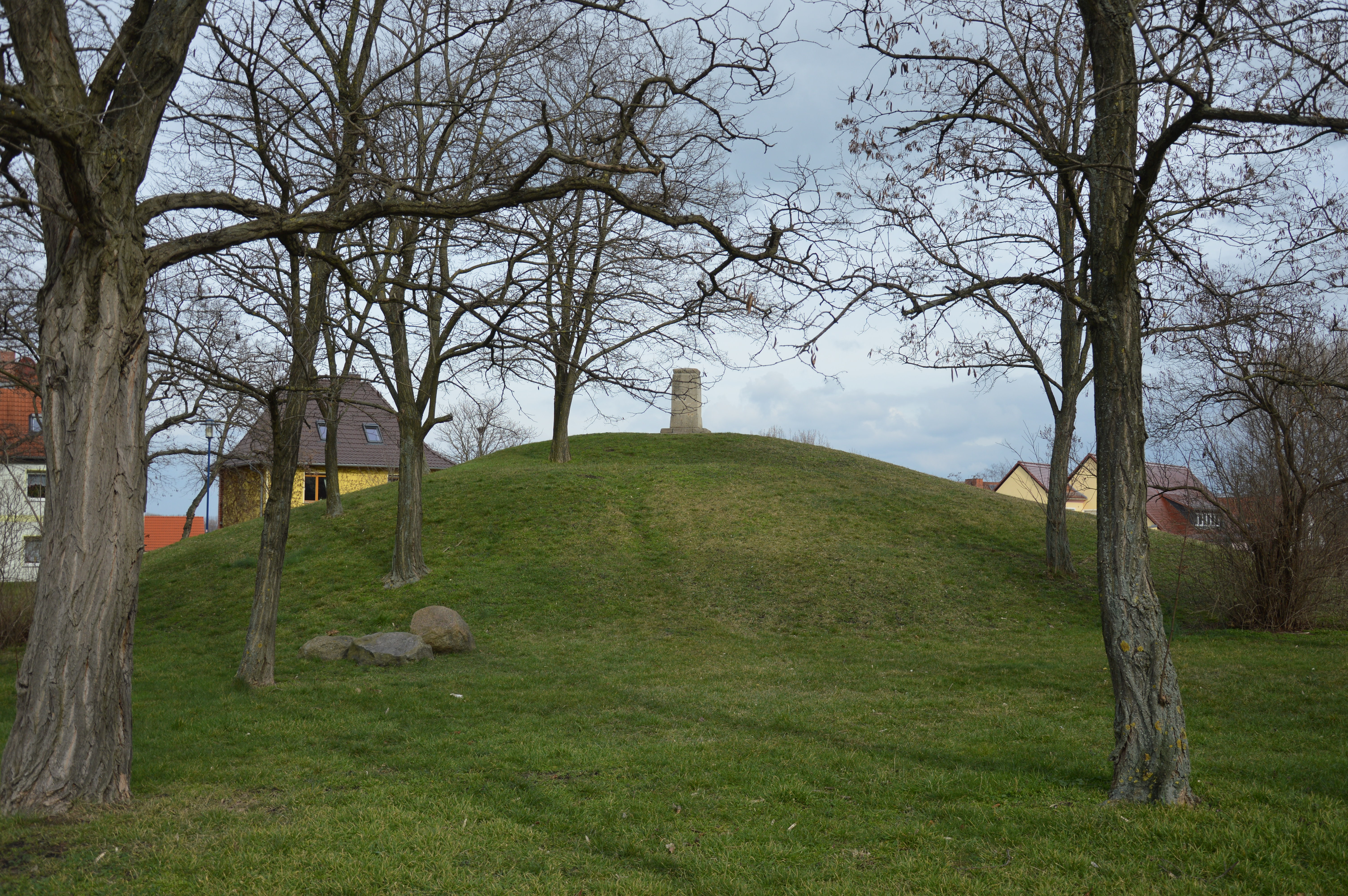
Rössen burial mound, Saxony-Anhalt, Germany

Burial occurred in flat graves or below small tumuli in a flexed position; on the continent males lay on their right side, females on the left, with the faces of both oriented to the south. However, in Sweden and also parts of northern Poland the graves were oriented north-south, men lay on their left side and women on the right side – both facing east. Originally, there was probably a wooden construction, since the graves are often positioned in a line. This is in contrast with practices in Denmark where the dead were buried below small mounds with a vertical stratigraphy: the oldest below the ground, the second above this grave, and occasionally even a third burial above those. Other types of burials are the niche-graves of Poland. Grave goods for men typically included a stone battle axe. Pottery in the shape of beakers and other types are the most common burial gifts, generally speaking. These were often decorated with cord, sometimes with incisions and other types of impressions. Other grave goods also included wagons and sacrificed animals.

The approximately contemporary Beaker culture had similar burial traditions, and together they covered most of Western and Central Europe. The Beaker culture originated around 2800 BC in the Iberian Peninsula and subsequently extended into Central Europe, where it partly coexisted with the Corded Ware region.

In April 2011, it was reported that an untypical Corded Ware burial had been discovered in a suburb of Prague. The remains, believed to be male, were orientated in the same way as women's burials and were not accompanied by any gender-specific grave goods. Based on this, and the importance usually attached to funeral rites by people from this period, the archaeologists suggested that this was unlikely to be accidental, and conclude that it was likely that this individual "was a man with a different sexual orientation, homosexual or transsexual", while media reports heralded the discovery of the world's first "gay caveman". Archaeologists and biological anthropologists criticised media coverage as sensationalist. Anthropologist Kristina Killgrove commented: "If this burial represents a transgendered [sic] individual (as well it could), that doesn't necessarily mean the person had a 'different sexual orientation' and certainly doesn't mean that he would have considered himself (or that his culture would have considered him) 'homosexual'". Other items of criticism were that someone buried in the Copper Age was not a "caveman" and that identifying the sex of skeletal remains is difficult and inexact. Turek notes that there are several examples of Corded Ware graves containing older biological males with typically female grave goods and body orientation. He suggests that "aged men may have decided to 'retire' as women for symbolic and practical reasons." A detailed account of the burial has not yet appeared in scientific literature.

== Gallery ==
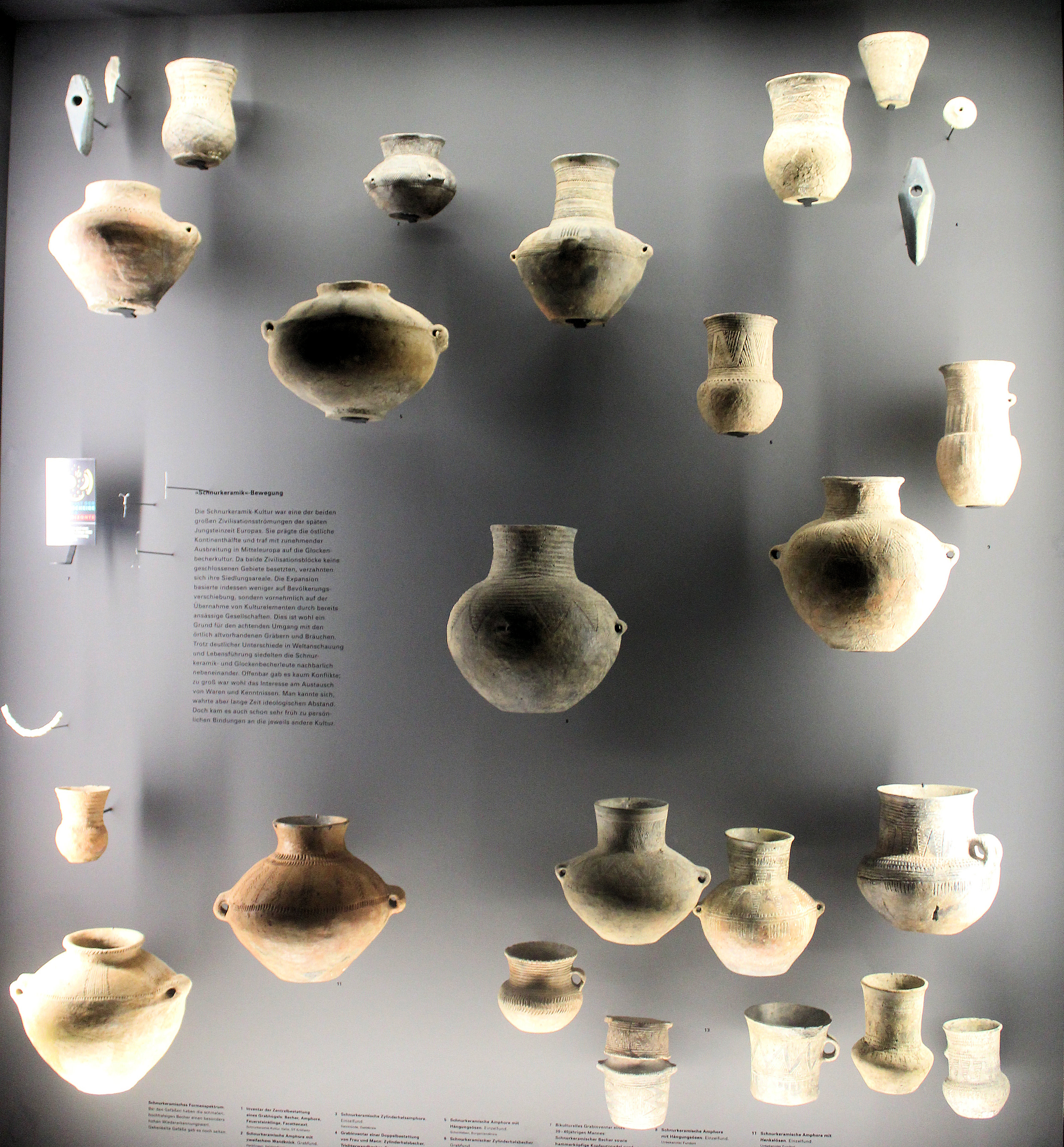
Pottery and axes, Germany

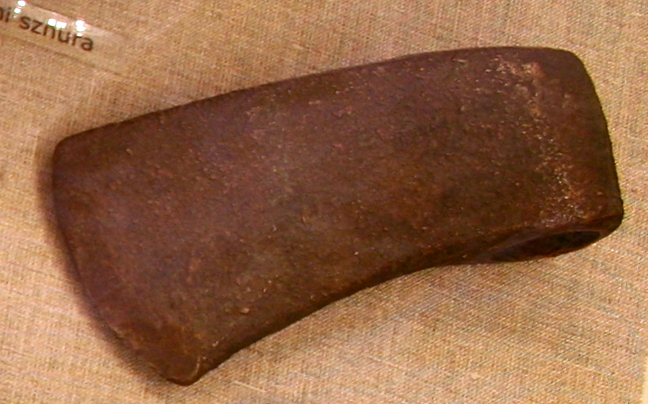
Copper axe, Poland

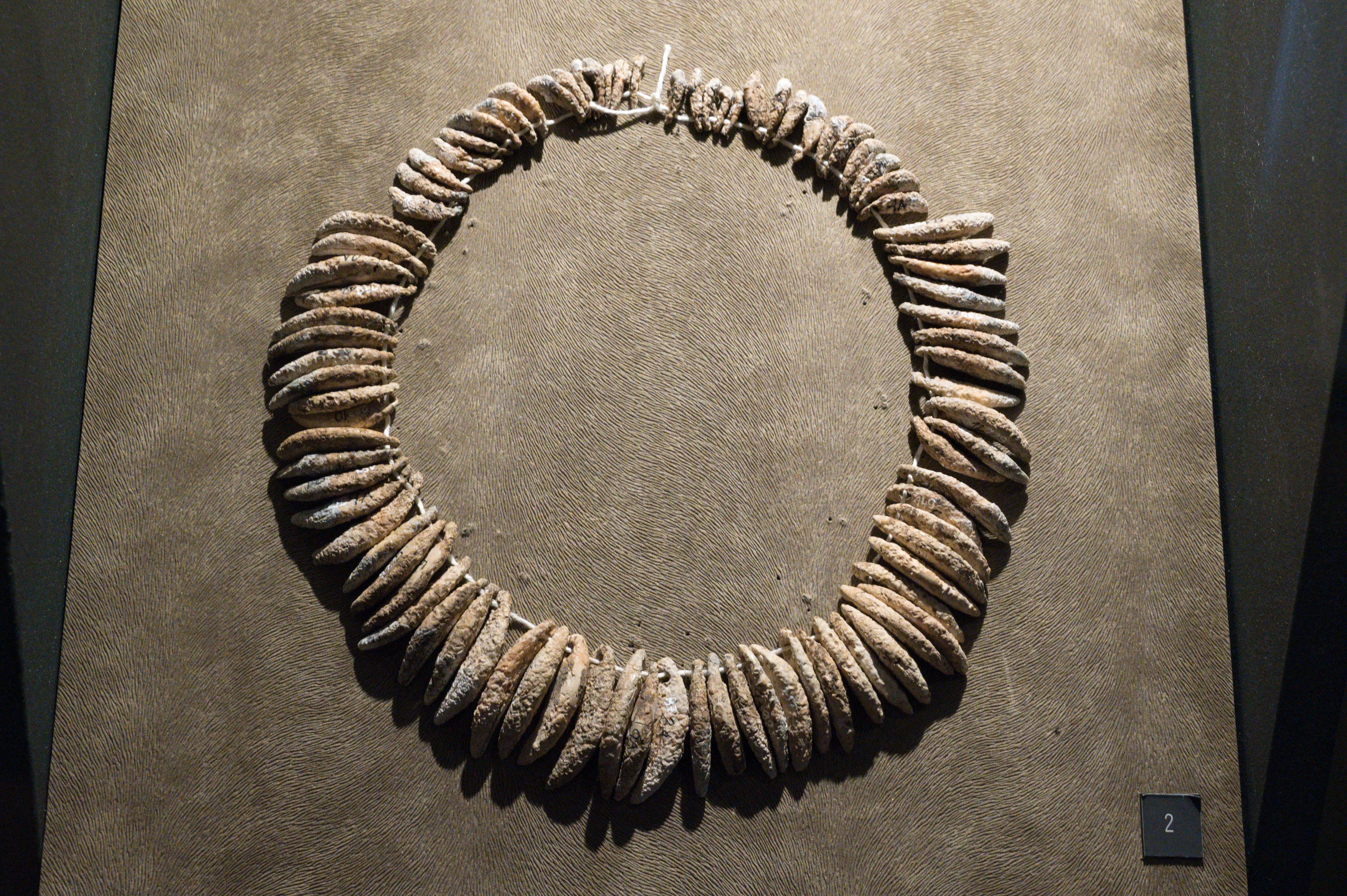
Necklace, Czech Republic

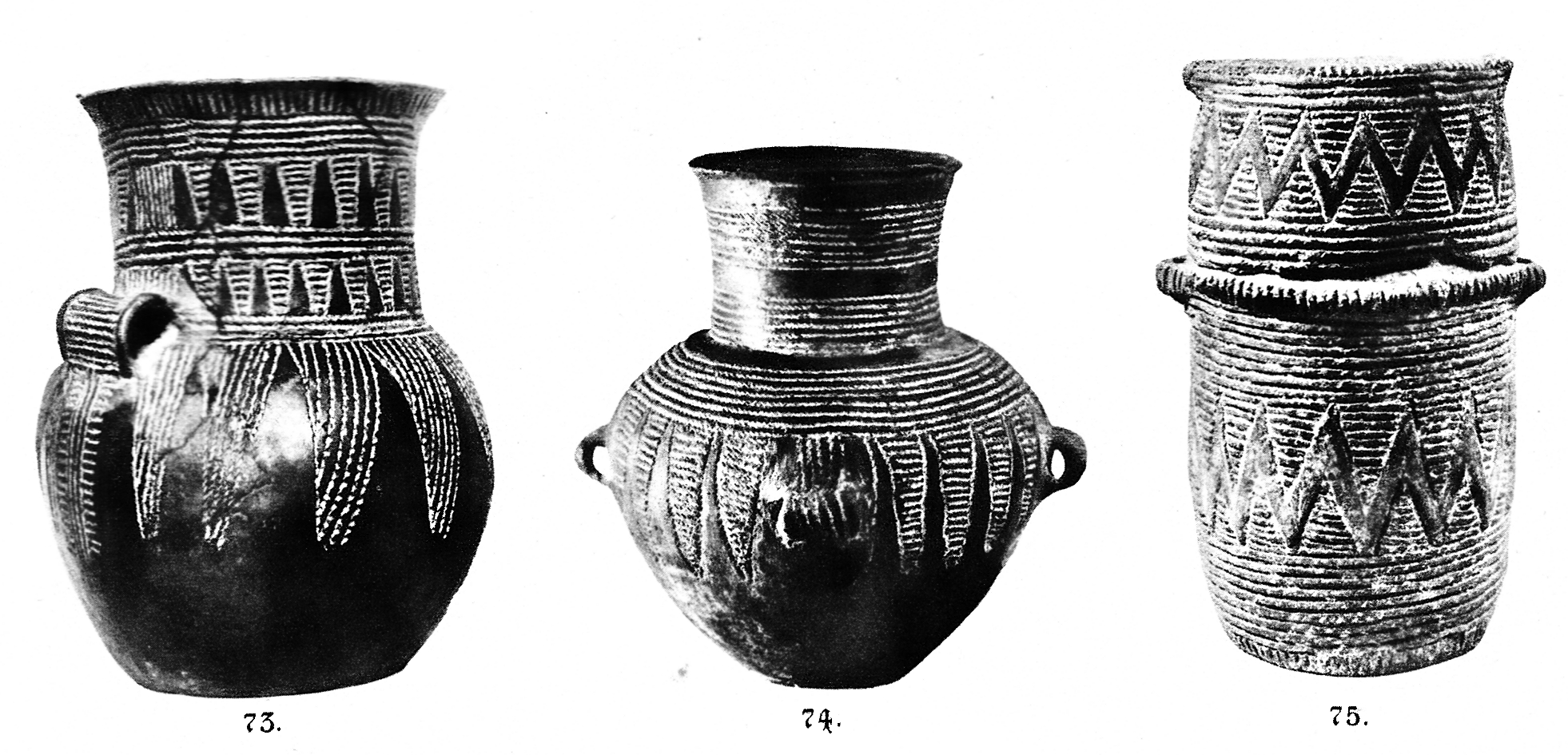
Pottery, Germany

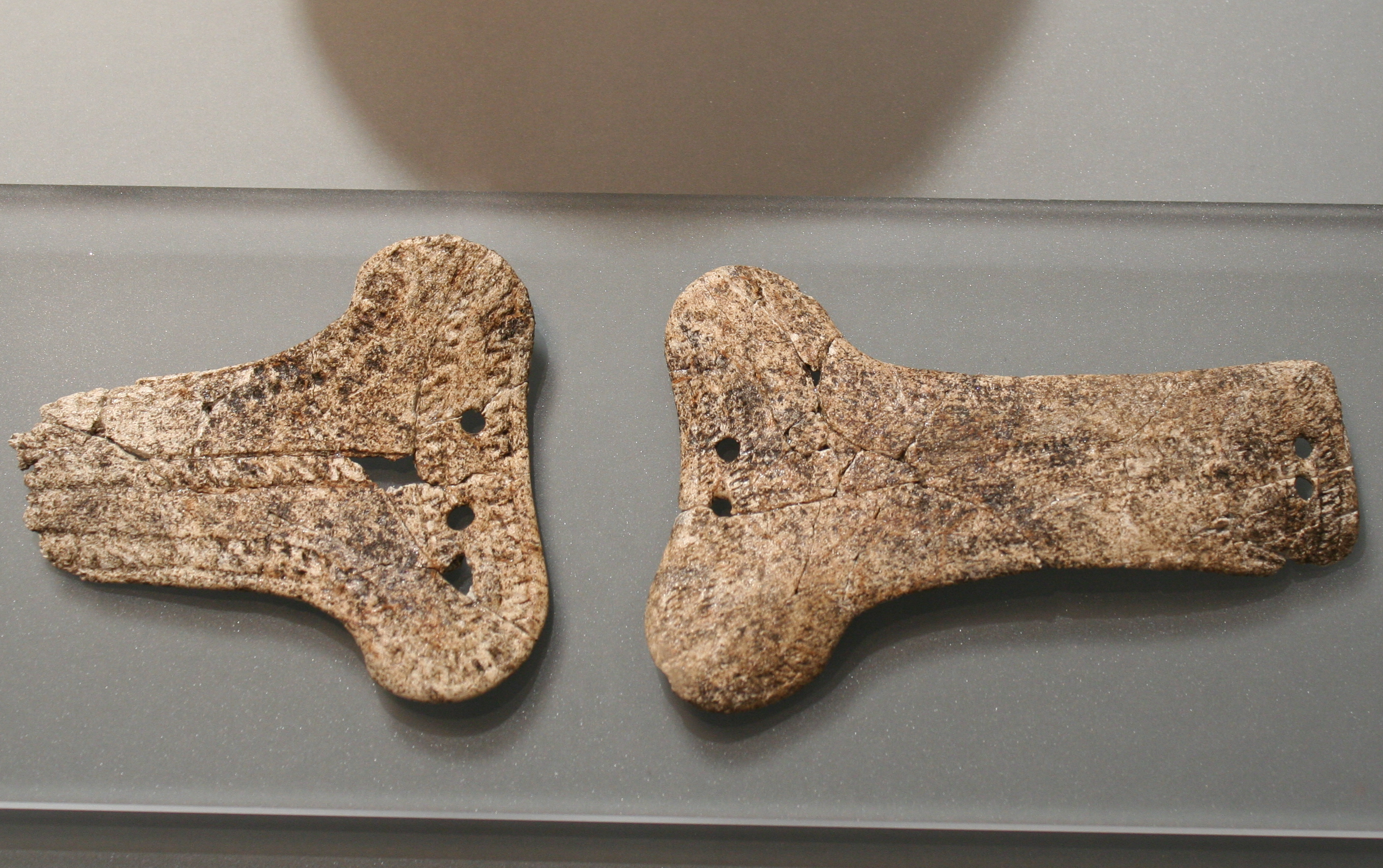
Belt plates made from bone

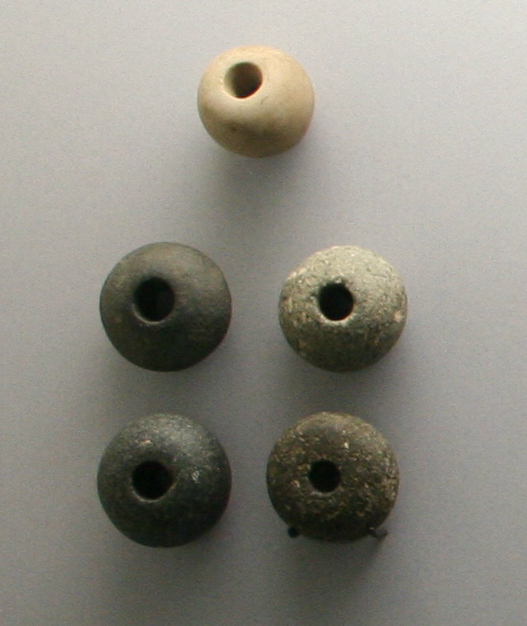
Stone maceheads, Denmark

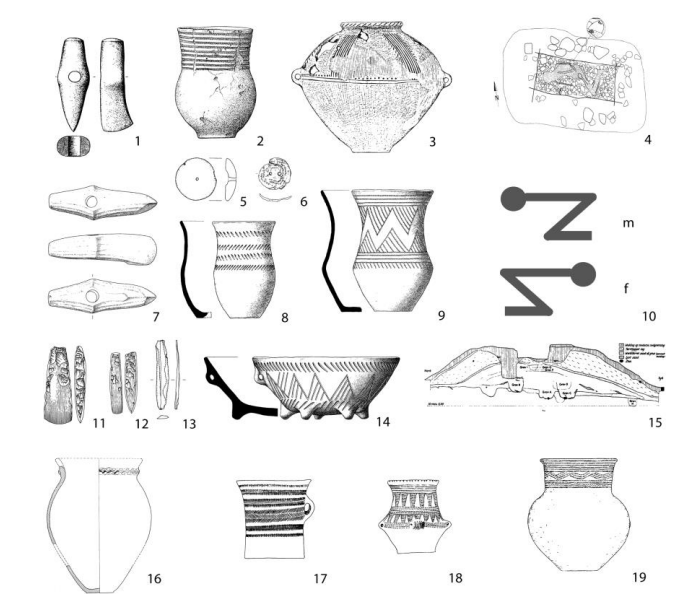
The "Corded ware package"

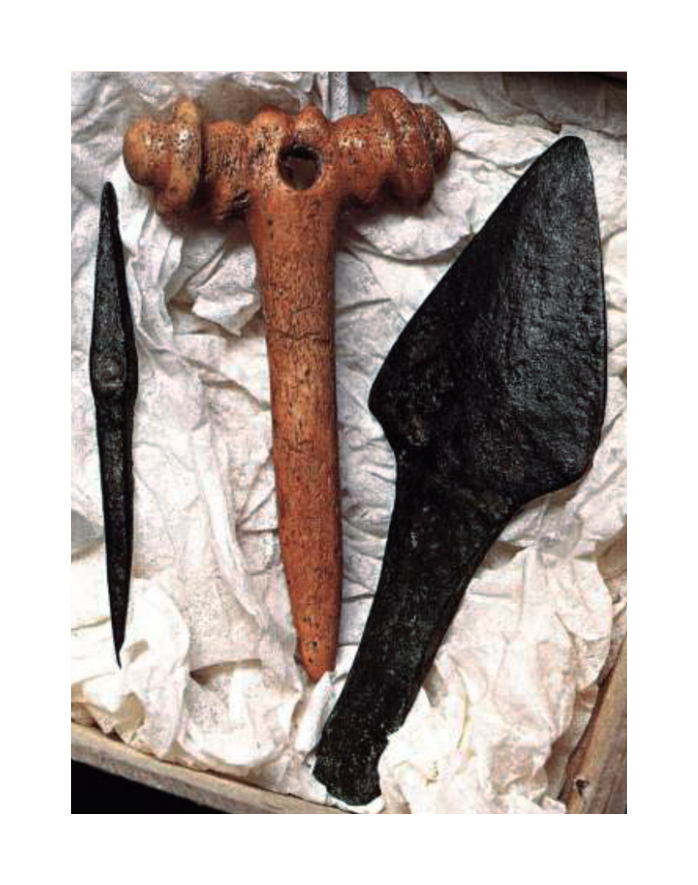
Copper dagger, awl and bone pin, Germany

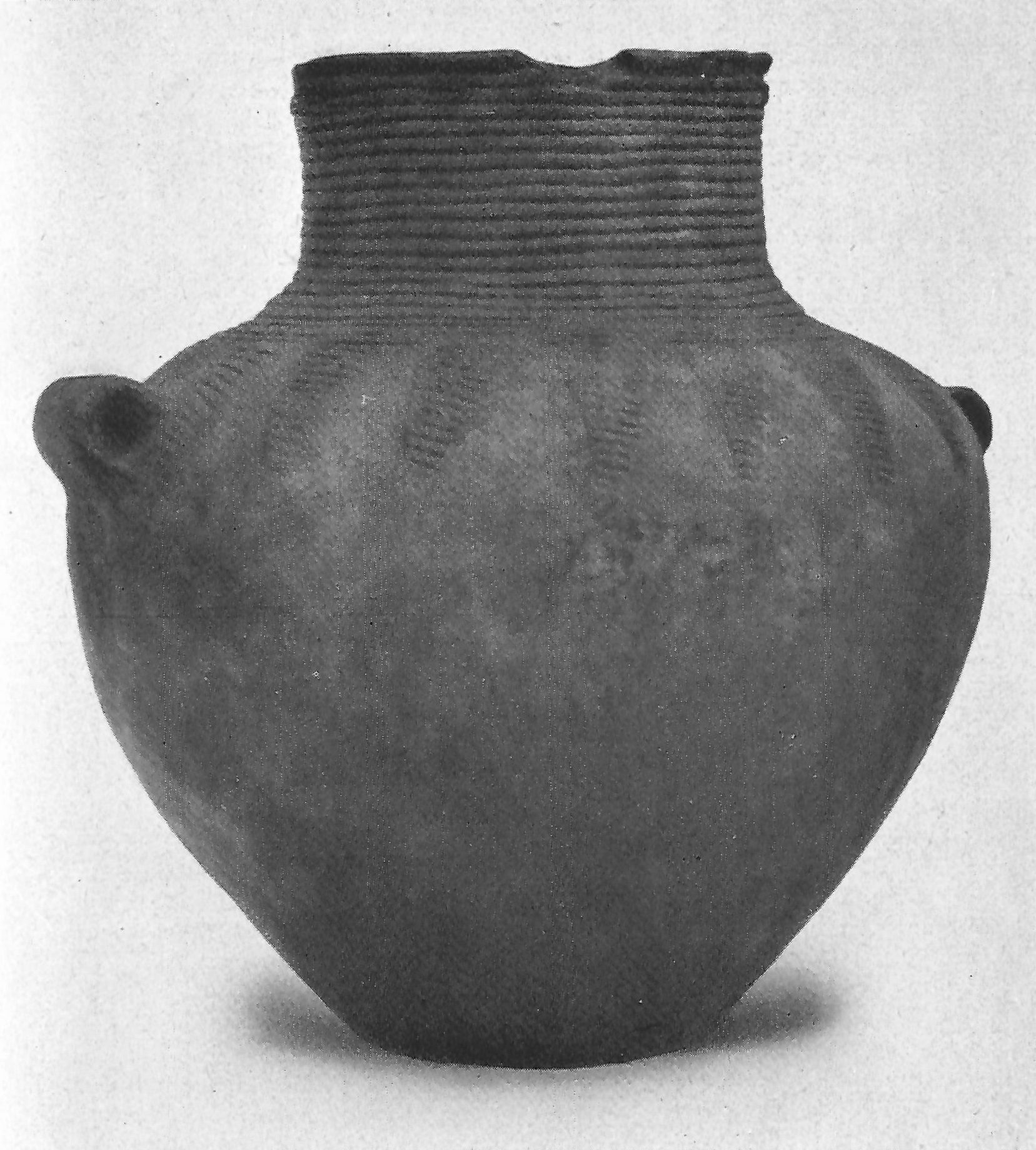
Corded Ware amphora, Germany

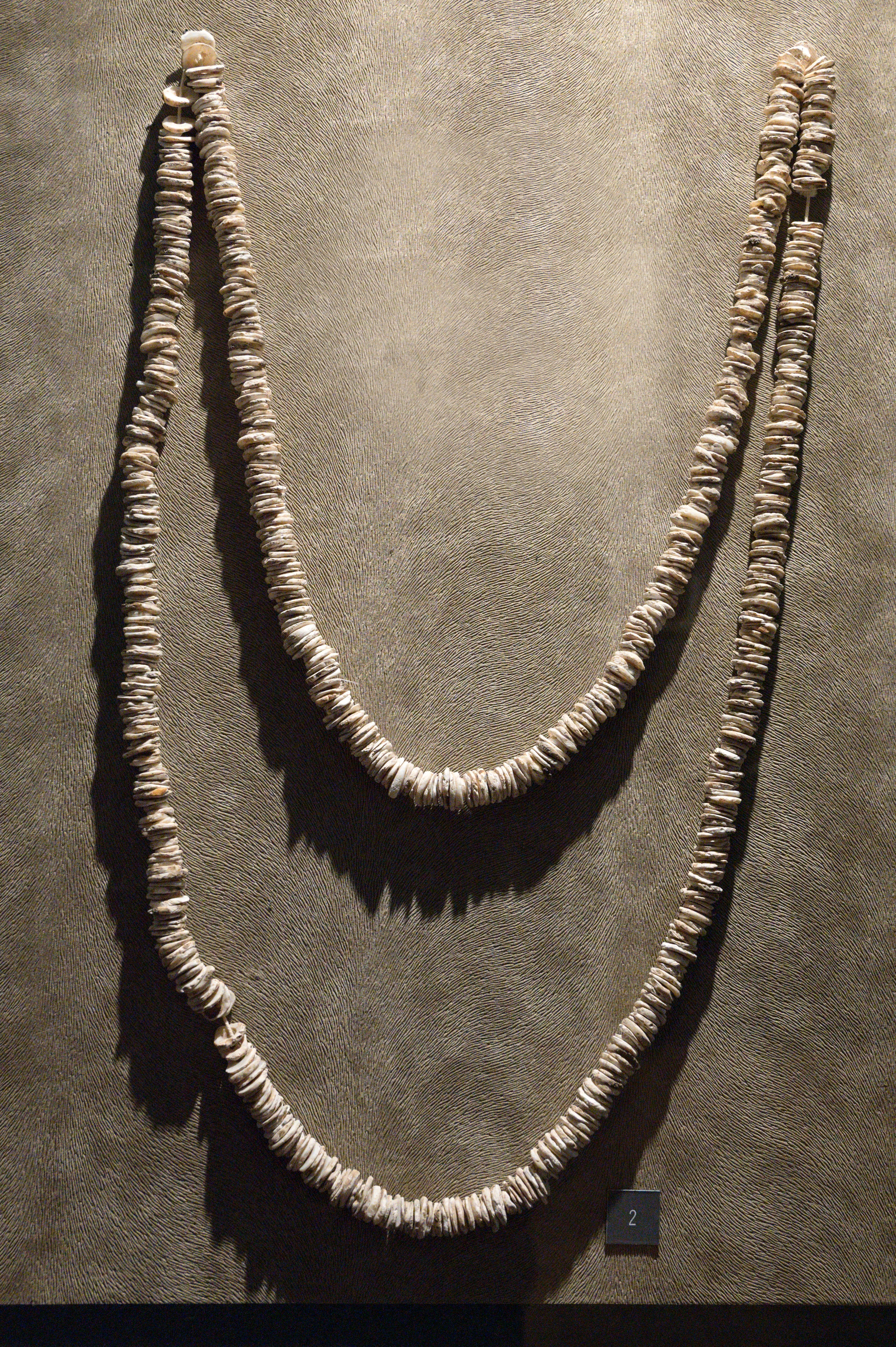
Necklaces made from shell beads, Czech Republic

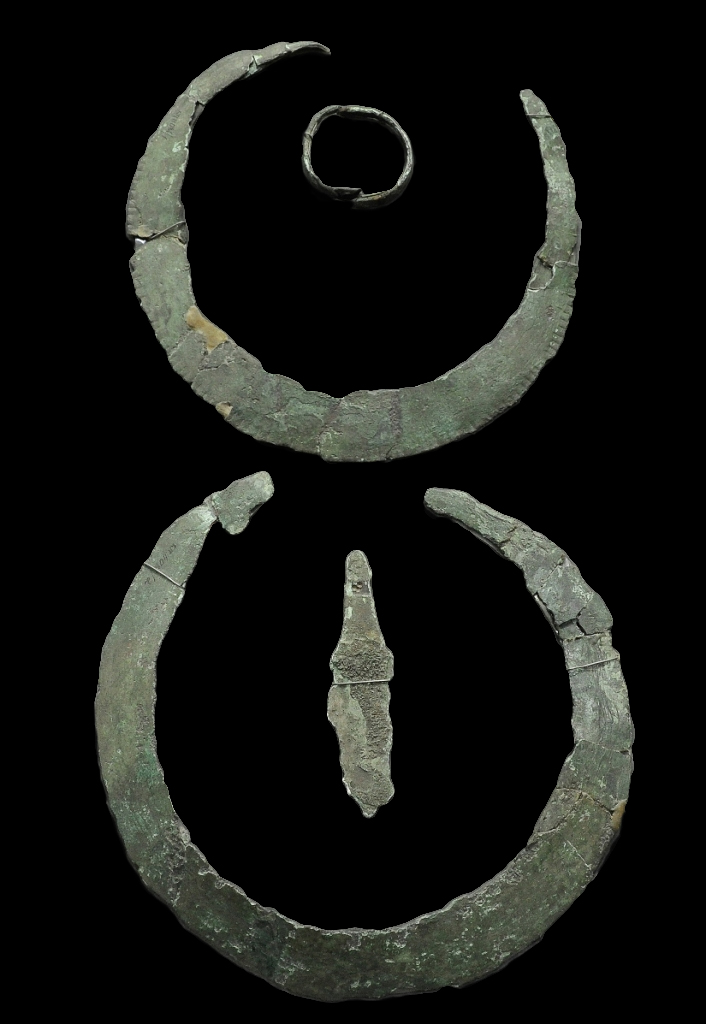
Copper lunulae from Belarus. Middle Dnieper culture

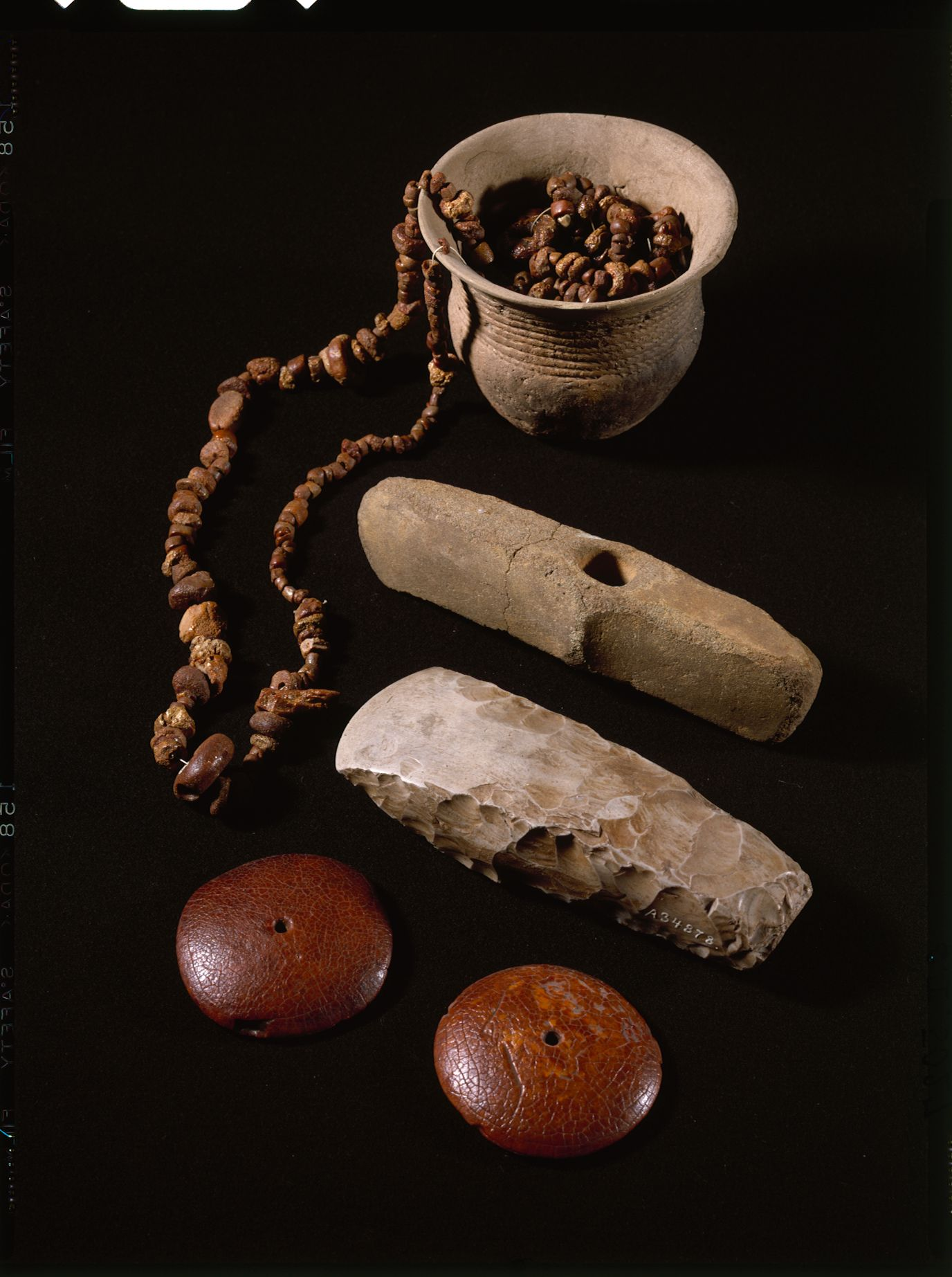
Amber disks and beads from Denmark

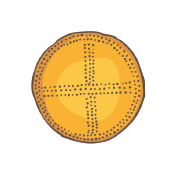
Amber disc with sun cross symbol (illustration)

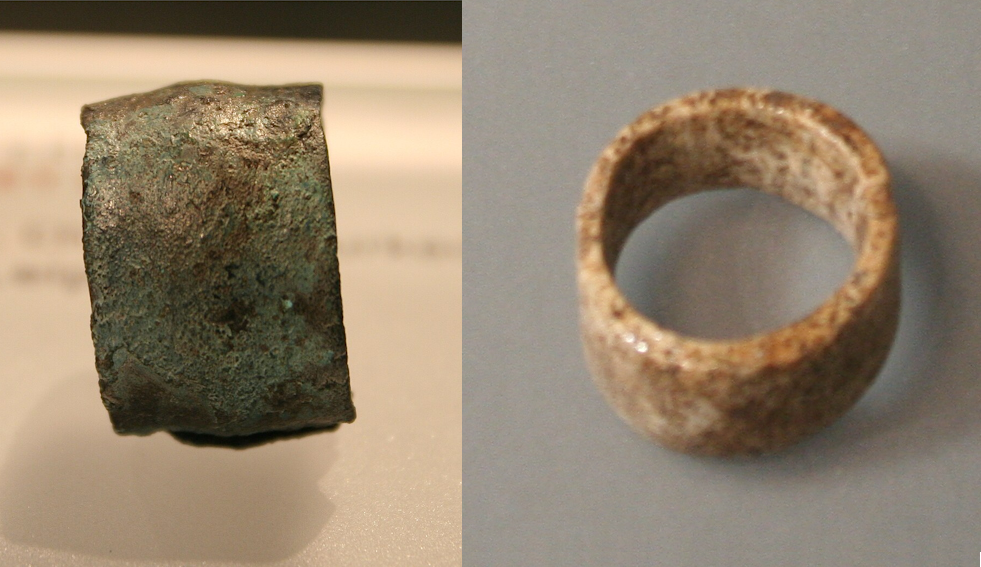
Rings made from copper and antler, Germany

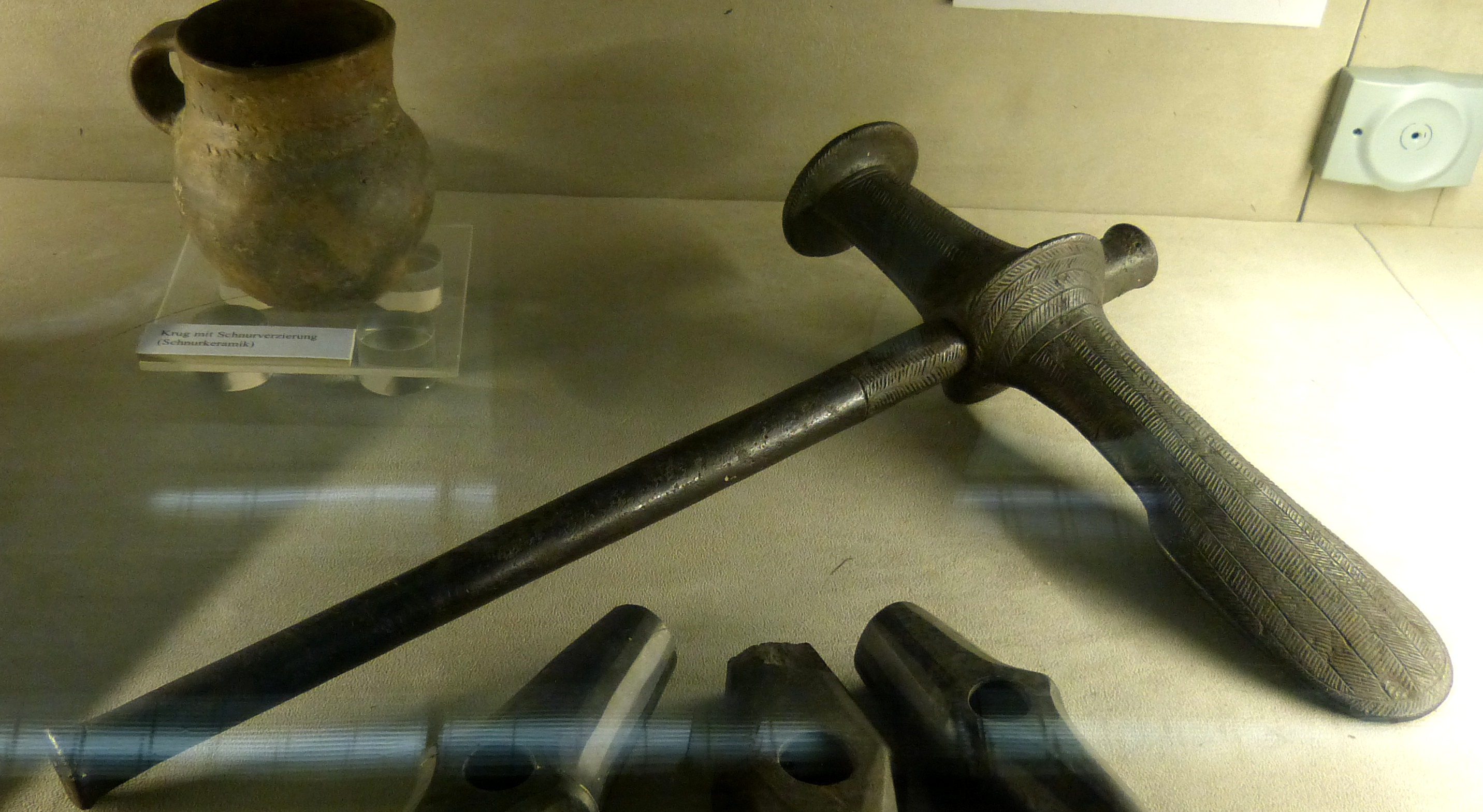
Decorated hammer-axe from Lusice, Moravia

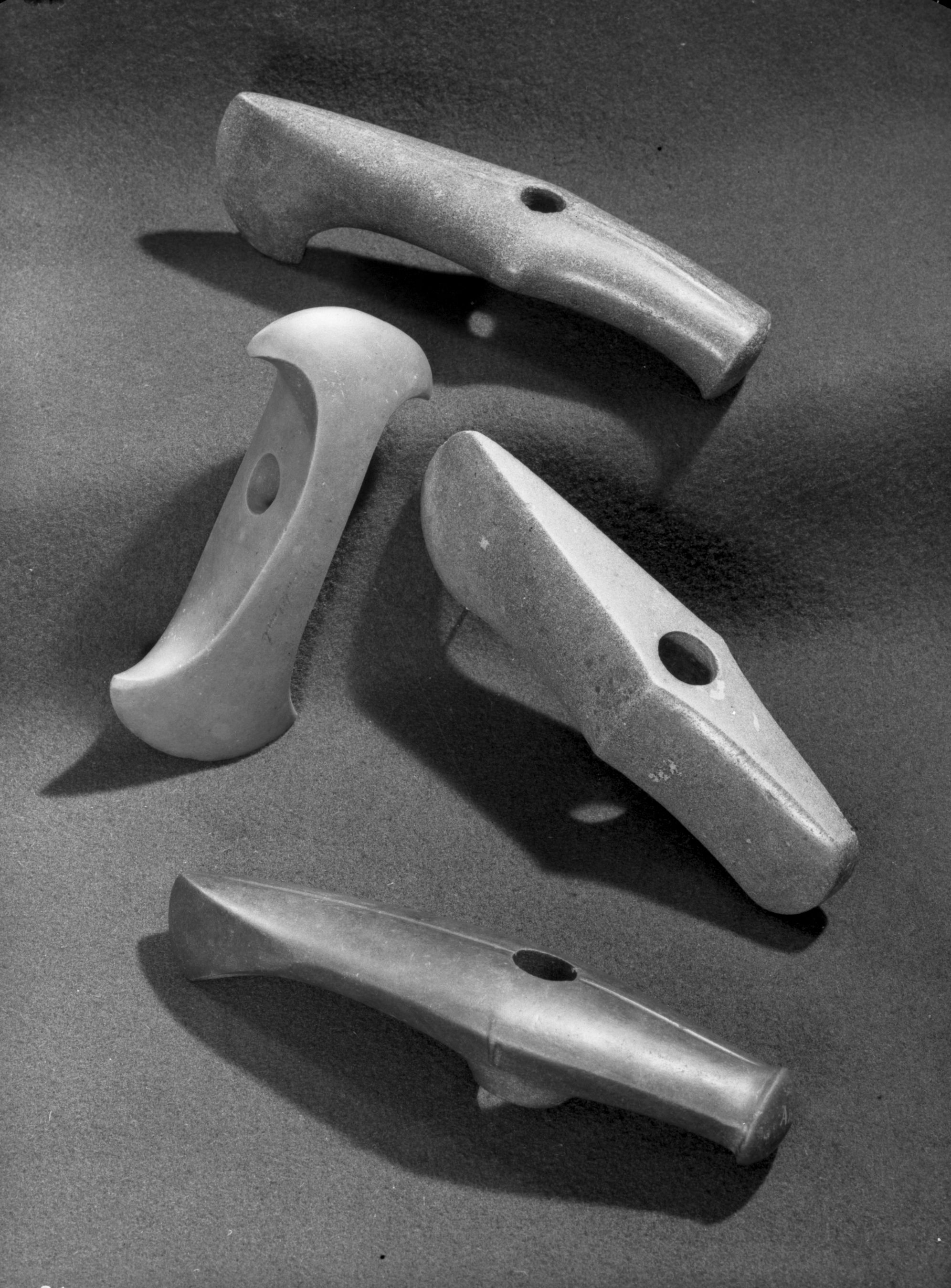
Stone battle-axes, Single Grave culture

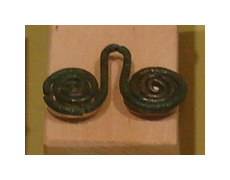
Copper spiral ornament, Fatyanovo culture

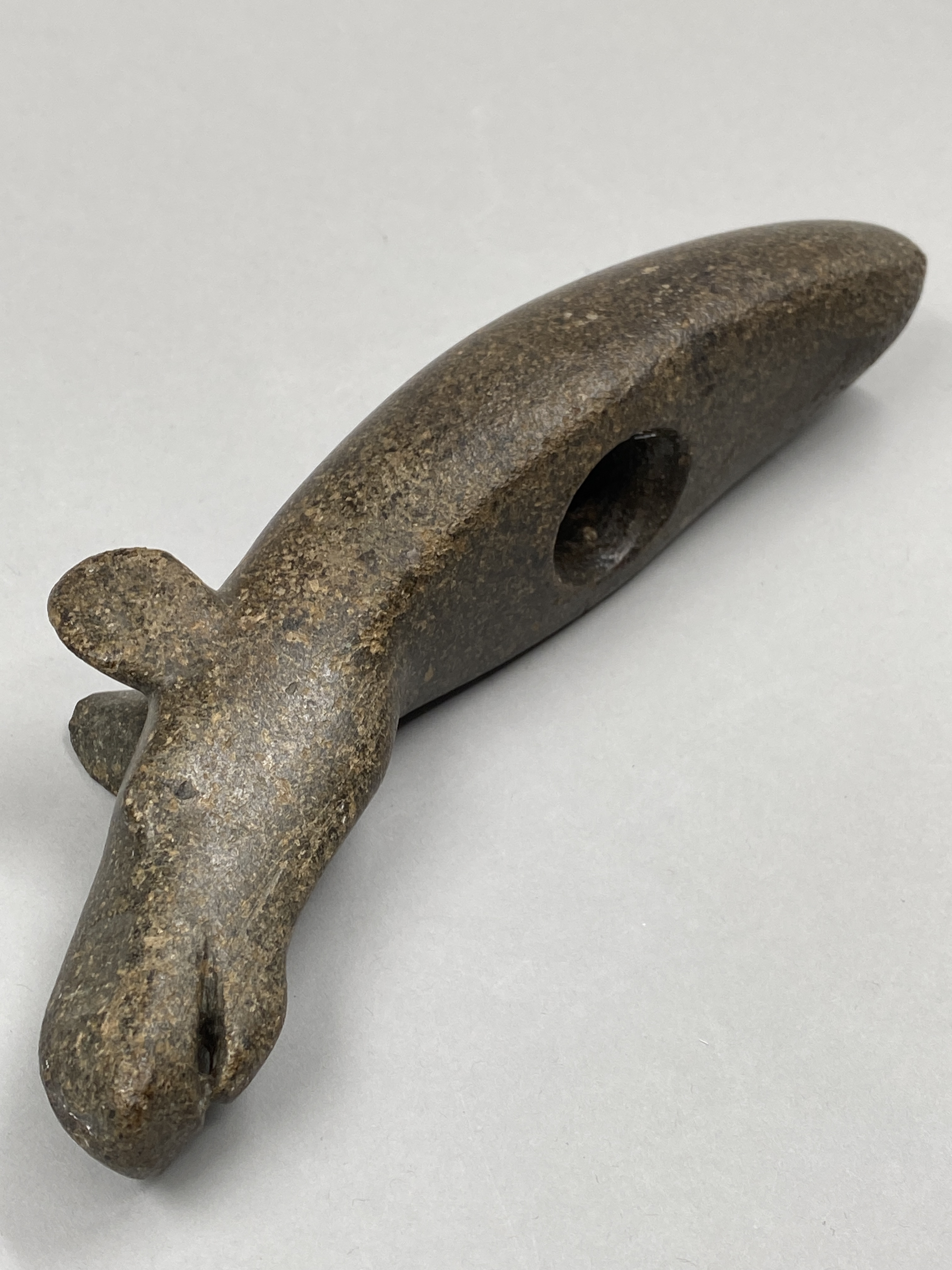
'Allunda Moose' ceremonial axe, Sweden, c. 2500 BC

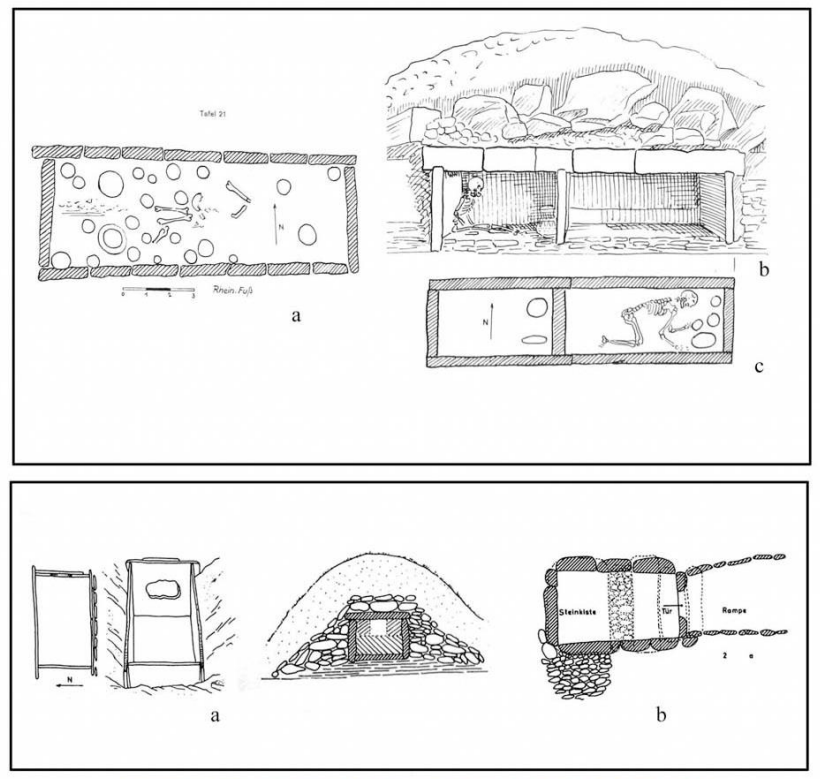
Stone cist graves in Germany

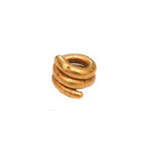
Gold spiral ornament

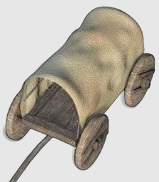
Wagon reconstruction

== Theories regarding linguistic identity ==
=== Spread of Indo-European languages ===
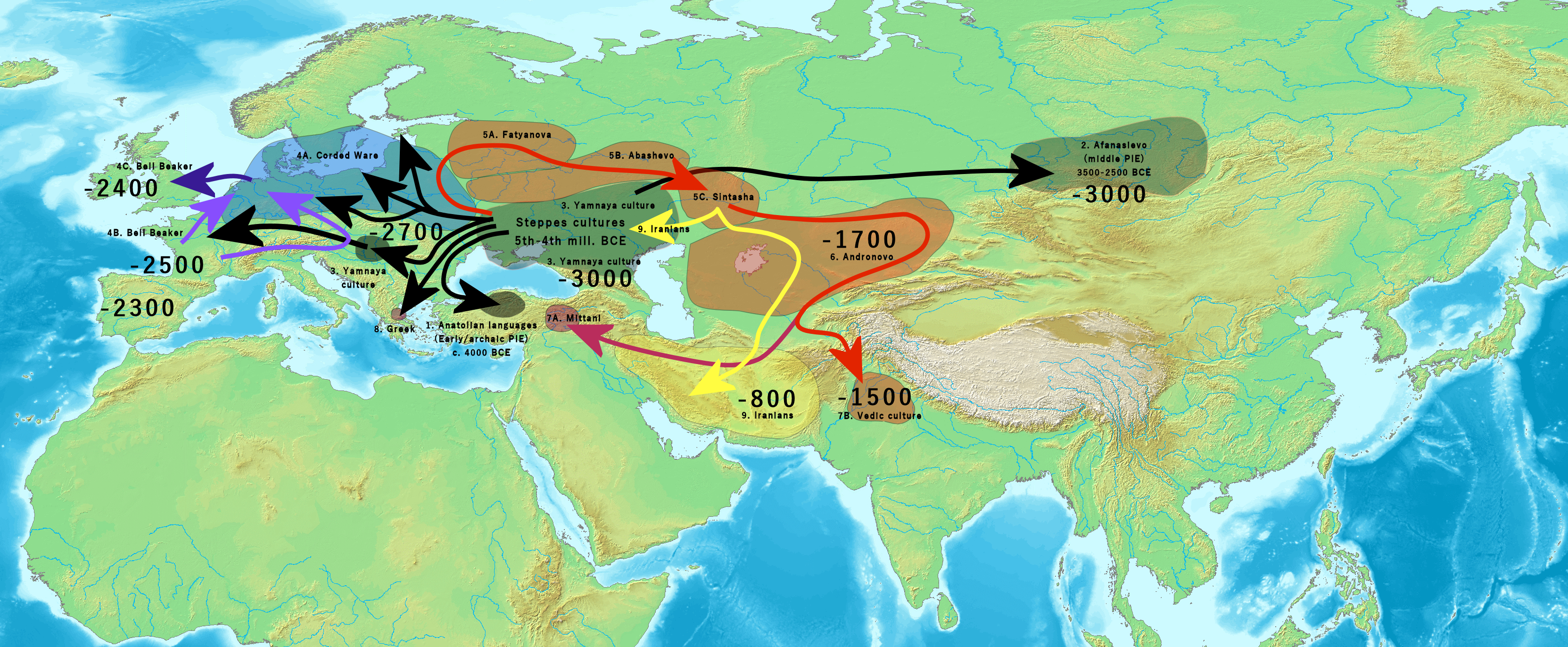
Early Indo-European migrations from the Pontic–Caspian steppe

The Corded Ware culture may have played a central role in the spread of the Indo-European languages in Europe during the Copper and Bronze Ages. It had often been suggested that the CWC represented the geolinguistic core of the Indo-European languages subsequent to the divergence of first the Anatolian and Tocharian languages and later a group ancestral to the Indo-Iranian, Greek, Armenian, Illyrian and/or Thracian languages; such models implied the CWC spoke a language ancestral to the Italo-Celtic, Germanic, and Balto-Slavic languages. According to Mallory (1999), the Corded Ware culture may have been "the common prehistoric ancestor of the later Celtic, Germanic, Baltic, Slavic, and possibly some of the Indo-European languages of Italy." Mallory (1999) also suggests that Corded Ware could not have been the sole source for Greek, Illyrian, Thracian and East Italic, which may be derived from Southeast Europe. Mallory (2013) proposes that the Beaker culture was associated with a European branch of Indo-European dialects, termed "North-West Indo-European", spreading northwards from the Alpine regions and ancestral to not only Celtic but equally Italic, Germanic and Balto-Slavic.

According to Anthony (2007), the Corded Ware horizon may have introduced Germanic, Baltic and Slavic into northern Europe. According to Anthony, the Pre-Germanic dialects may have developed in the Usatove culture in South Eastern Europe encompassing parts of Romania, Moldova and Ukraine between c. 3100 and 2800 BC, and spread with the Corded Ware culture. Between 3100 and 2800/2600 BC, a real folk migration of Proto-Indo-European speakers from the Yamnaya culture took place into the Danube Valley, which eventually reached as far as Hungary, where pre-Celtic and pre-Italic may have developed. Slavic and Baltic developed at the middle Dniepr (present-day Ukraine).

Haak et al. (2015) envision a migration from the Yamnaya culture into Germany. Allentoft et al. (2015) envision a migration from the Yamnaya culture towards north-western Europe via Central Europe, and towards the Baltic area and the eastern periphery of the Corded Ware culture via the territory of present-day Ukraine, Belarus and Russia.

=== Theoretical explanation: language shift ===
According to Gimbutas' original theory, the process of "Indo-Europeanization" of Corded Ware (and, later, the rest of Europe) was essentially a cultural transformation, not a genetic one. The Yamnaya migration from Eastern to Central and Western Europe is understood by Gimbutas as a military victory, resulting in the Yamnaya imposing a new administrative system, language and religion upon the indigenous groups. (Note: Gimbutas uses the term Old Europe to refer to indigenous, pre-Indo-European peoples in Europe during the Neolithic—including the Chalcolithic—representing a clearly unbroken cultural tradition of nearly 3 millennia (c. 6500–3500 BC). Notably, the Narva culture, the Funnelbeaker culture, the Linear Pottery culture, the Cardium pottery culture, the Vinča culture, the early Helladic culture, and the Minoans, among others, are all part of her "Old Europe".) (Note: Marija Gimbutas: "[t]hree millennium long traditions were truncated by two waves of semi-nomadic horse-riding Kurgan people from the east: the towns and villages disintegrated, the magnificent painted pottery vanished; so did the shrines, frescoes, sculptures, symbols and script. ... [This] is evident in the archaeological record not only by the abrupt absence of the magnificent painted pottery and figurines and the termination of sign use, but by the equally abrupt appearance of thrusting weapons and horses infiltrating the Danubian Valley and other major grasslands of the Balkans and Central Europe. Their arrival initiated a dramatic shift in the prehistory of Europe, a change in social structure and in residence patterns, in art and in religion and it was a decisive factor in the formation of Europe's last 5,000 years.")

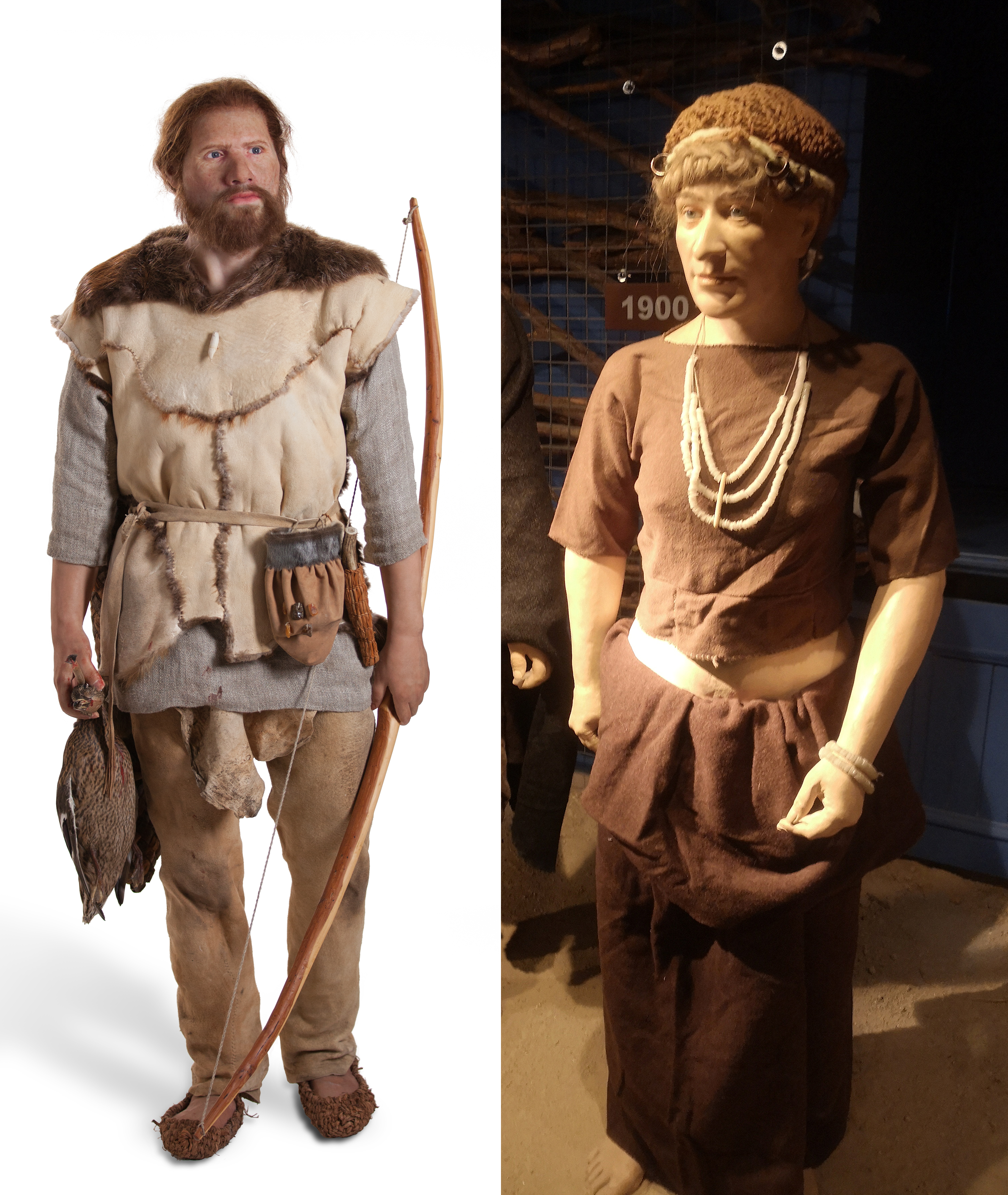
Reconstructions of a Corded Ware man from the Netherlands and woman from Poland

David Anthony (2007), in his "revised Steppe hypothesis", proposes that the spread of the Indo-European languages probably did not happen through "chain-type folk migrations", but by the introduction of these languages by ritual and political elites, which were emulated by large groups of people, a process which he calls "elite recruitment". (Note: David Anthony (1995): "Language shift can be understood best as a social strategy through which individuals and groups compete for positions of prestige, power, and domestic security [...] What is important, then, is not just dominance, but vertical social mobility and a linkage between language and access to positions of prestige and power [...] A relatively small immigrant elite population can encourage widespread language shift among numerically dominant indigenes in a non-state or pre-state context if the elite employs a specific combination of encouragements and punishments. Ethnohistorical cases [...] demonstrate that small elite groups have successfully imposed their languages in non-state situations.") Yet, in supplementary information to Haak et al. (2015), Anthony, together with Lazaridis, Haak, Patterson, and Reich, note that the mass migration of Yamnaya people to northern Europe shows that "the Steppe hypothesis does not require elite dominance to have transmitted Indo-European languages into Europe. Instead, our results show that the languages could have been introduced simply by strength of numbers: via major migration in which both sexes participated." (Note: Anthony, Lazaridis, Haak, Patterson & Reich further note: "the main argument in favor of the Anatolian hypothesis (that major language change requires major migration) can now also be applied to the Steppe hypothesis." "our results level the playing field between the two leading hypotheses [the Steppe hypothesis and the Anatolian hypothesis] of Indo-European origins, as we now know that both the Early Neolithic and the Late Neolithic were associated with major migrations.")

Linguist Guus Kroonen points out that speakers of Indo-European languages encountered existing populations in Europe that spoke unrelated, non-Indo-European languages when they migrated further into Europe from the Yamnaya culture's steppe zone at the margin of Europe. He focuses on both the effects on Indo-European languages that resulted from this contact and investigation of the pre-existing languages. Relatively little is known about the Pre-Indo-European linguistic landscape of Europe, except for Basque, as the "Indo-Europeanization" of Europe caused a massive and largely unrecorded linguistic extinction event, most likely through language shift. Kroonen's 2015 study claims to show that Pre-Indo-European speech contains a clear Neolithic signature emanating from the Aegean language family and thus patterns with the prehistoric migration of Europe's first farming populations.

Marija Gimbutas, as part of her theory, had already inferred that the Corded Ware culture's intrusion into Scandinavia formed a synthesis with the indigenous people of the Funnelbeaker culture, giving birth to the Proto-Germanic language. According to Edgar Polomé, 30% of the non-Indo-European substratum found in the modern German language derives from non-Indo-European-speakers of Funnelbeaker culture, indigenous to southern Scandinavia. She claimed that when Yamnaya Indo-European speakers came into contact with the indigenous peoples during the 3rd millennium BC, they came to dominate the local populations yet parts of the indigenous lexicon persisted in the formation of Proto-Germanic, thus giving Proto-Germanic the status of being an "Indo-Europeanized" language. However, more recent linguists have substantially reduced the number of roots claimed to be uniquely Germanic, and more recent treatments of Proto-Germanic tend to reject or simply omit discussion of the Germanic substrate hypothesis, giving little reason to consider Germanic anything but a typical Indo-European dialect with at most minor substrate influence.

== Genetic studies ==
=== Relation with Yamnaya-culture ===
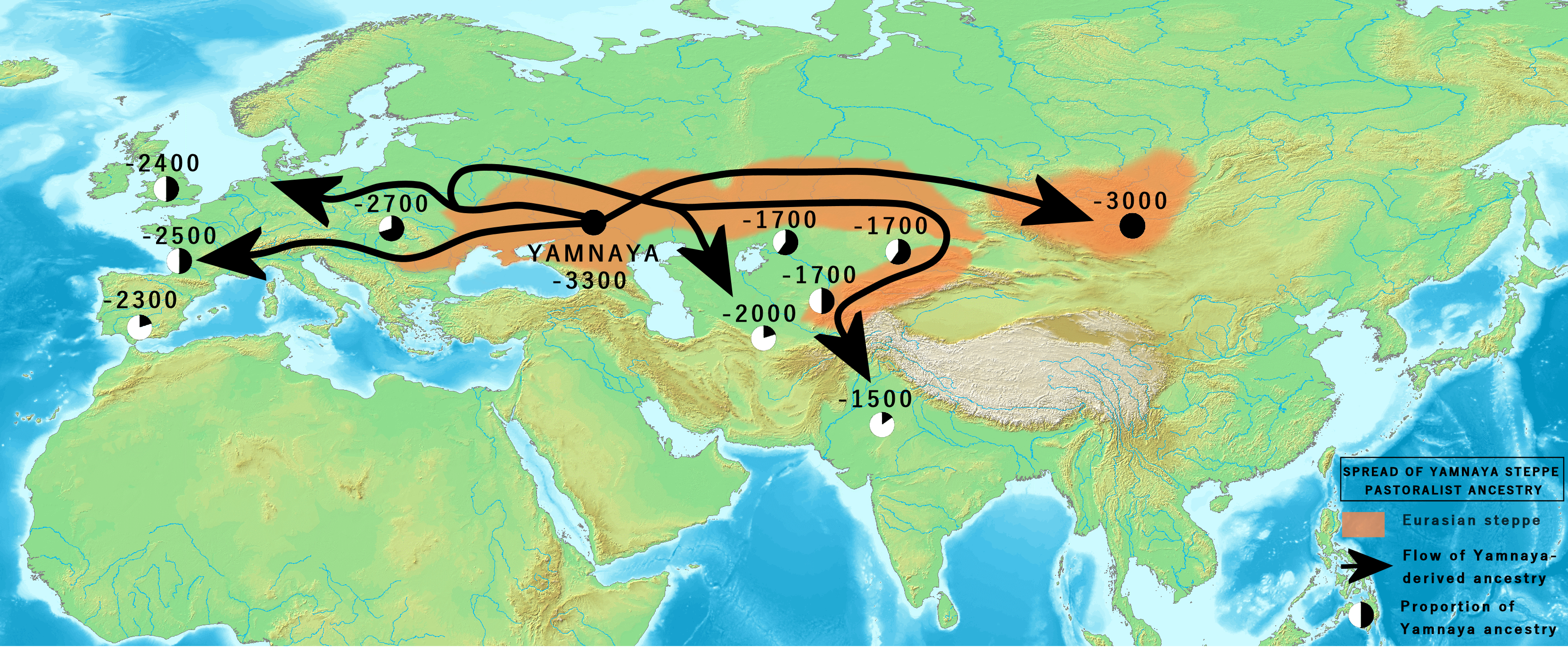
Bronze Age spread of Yamnaya steppe pastoralist ancestry

Haak et al. (2015) found that a large proportion of the ancestry of the Corded Ware culture's population is similar to that of the Yamnaya culture, tracing the Corded Ware culture's origins to a "massive migration" of the Yamnaya or an earlier (pre-Yamnaya) population from the steppes 4,500 years ago. The DNA of late Neolithic Corded Ware skeletons found in Germany was found to be around 75% similar to DNA from individuals of the Yamnaya culture. Yet, Haak et al. (2015) warned:

We caution that the sampled Yamnaya individuals from Samara might not be directly ancestral to Corded Ware individuals from Germany. It is possible that a more western Yamnaya population, or an earlier (pre-Yamnaya) steppe population may have migrated into central Europe, and future work may uncover more missing links in the chain of transmission of steppe ancestry.

The same study estimated a 40–54% ancestral contribution of so-called "steppe ancestry" in the DNA of modern Central & Northern Europeans, and a 20–32% contribution in modern Southern Europeans, excluding Sardinians (7.1% or less), and to a lesser extent Sicilians (11.6% or less). Haak et al. (2015) further found that autosomal DNA tests indicate that westward migration from the steppes was responsible for the introduction of a component of ancestry referred to as "Ancient North Eurasian" admixture into western Europe. "Ancient North Eurasian" is the name given in genetic literature to a component that represents descent from the people of the Mal'ta-Buret' culture or a population closely related to them. The "Ancient North Eurasian" genetic component is visible in tests of the Yamnaya people as well as modern-day Europeans, but not of Western or Central Europeans predating the Corded Ware culture.

Heyd (2017) has cautioned to be careful with drawing too strong conclusions from those genetic similarities between Corded Ware and Yamnaya, noting the small number of samples; the late dates of the Esperstadt graves, which could also have undergone Bell Beaker admixture; the presence of Yamnaya ancestry in western Europe before the Danube expansion; and the risks of extrapolating "the results from a handful of individual burials to whole ethnically interpreted populations." Heyd confirms the close connection between Corded Ware and Yamnaya, but also states that "neither a one-to-one translation from Yamnaya to CWC, nor even the 75:25 ratio as claimed (Haak et al. 2015:211) fits the archaeological record."

In the early 3rd millennium BC, the Corded Ware culture appeared in Northern Europe. Genetic studies suggest that Funnelbeaker women of European Neolithic farmer ancestry were incorporated into the Corded Ware culture through intermixing with incoming Corded Ware males of Yamnaya ancestry. Saag et al. (2017) found that the people of the Corded Ware culture in the eastern Baltic carried "Steppe ancestry on the male side" and "some European early farmer genetic ancestry on the female side".

An archaeogenetic study focusing on late Neolithic and Bronze Age individuals from Bohemia, Papac et al. (2021), which includes Haak and Heyd as co-authors, suggests that the early Corded Ware culture was a "polyethnic" society characterized by genetic, cultural, and linguistic diversity, resulting from the agglomeration of people of the Globular Amphora culture and Yamnaya-related migrants, who had highly differentiated genetic profiles, a different material culture, and probably spoke different languages. One hundred percent of the Bohemian Corded Ware samples found without steppe-derived ancestry were female, indicating that this genetic diversity was a result of Corded Ware males marrying and assimilating local Globular Amphora females. Later Corded Ware individuals of Central Europe were less differentiated genetically. This study also detected ancestry similar to Latvia Middle Neolithic ("Latvia_MN-like"), or Ukraine Neolithic in early Corded Ware individuals, suggesting either a northeast European Eneolithic forest steppe contribution to early CW, partially supported by archaeology, or alternatively a contribution from a hypothetical steppe population carrying this ancestry, which the authors consider less likely. This ancestry made up 5–15% of the early Corded Ware ancestry, depending on the model used.

=== Y-DNA ===
==== R1a and R1b ====
According to Malmström et al. (2019), neither R1a nor R1b-M269 have been reported among Neolithic populations of central and western Europe, although they were common among earlier hunter gatherers of Eastern Europe. Haak et al. note that their results suggest that these haplogroups "spread into Europe from the East after 3,000 BC."

The majority of CWC-men carried haplogroup R1a-M417, the remaining ones R1b and I2a. Note that, although related to the Corded Ware population, Yamnaya males mainly carried R1b-Z2103, while R1b-bearing Corded Ware males had R1b-L51, suggesting that Corded Ware culture males cannot be directly patrilineally descended from Yamnaya individuals. (Note: R1b: Malmström 2019: "Individuals from the Pontic–Caspian steppe, associated with the Yamnaya Culture, carry mostly R1b and not R1a haplotypes." Linderholm 2020: "The Y chromosome haplogroup lineage R1b-M269 or R-L11 are characteristic of Yamnaya and Bell Beaker individuals and they were particularly widespread throughout Eurasia in the Bronze Age and thereafter. Curiously, the haplogroup is uncommon among other published Corded Ware Complex individuals from Europe (Germany, Poland, Bohemia, Estonia, Lithuania) and is associated with the later Bell Beaker communities." Sjögren (2020): "All the Bell Beaker male burials with sufficient data in our two cemeteries belong to a single Y-chromosome lineage, R1b-M269, which is the major lineage associated with the arrival of Steppe ancestry in western Europe after 2500 BC. In the preceding and partly contemporary Corded Ware populations of central Europe, another Y-haplogroup dominated, R1a, although R1b also occurs albeit in small numbers.") Yet, Linderholm et al. (2020) found seven CW males which were narrowed down to either R1b-M269 or R-L11, while Allentoft et al. (2015) report two CW males with R1b, and Furtwängler et al. (2020) report three CW males with R1b. According to Sjögren et al. (2020), R1b-M269 "is the major lineage associated with the arrival of Steppe ancestry in western Europe after 2500 BC[E]."

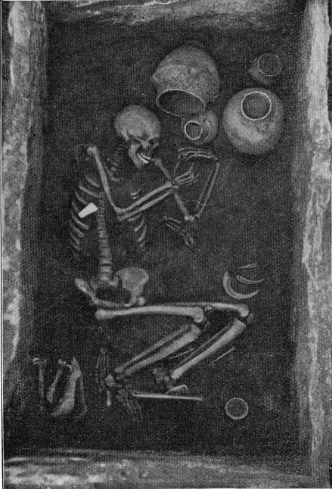
Stone cist grave, Germany

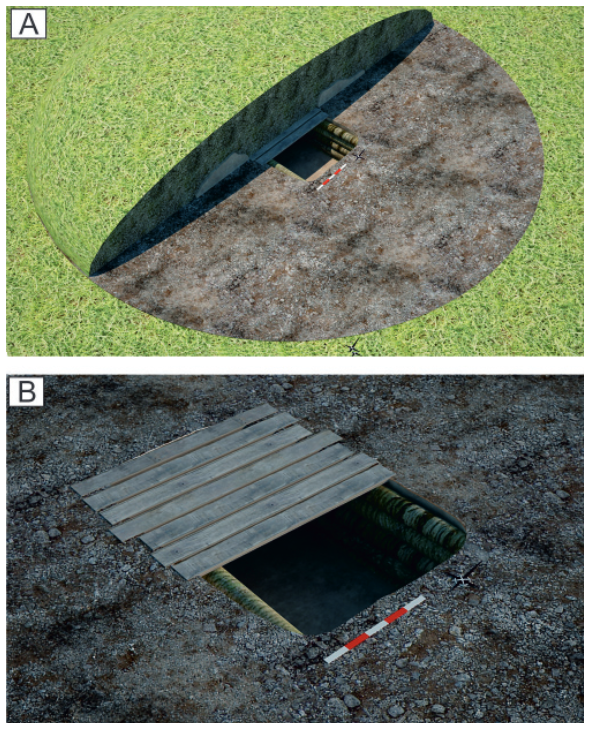
Reconstruction of a burial mound and burial chamber, Poland

Papac et al. (2021) argue that the differences in Y-DNA between early CW and Yamnaya males suggest that the Yamnaya culture did not have a direct role in the origins and expansion of the Corded Ware culture. They found that a majority of early Corded Ware males in Bohemia belonged to R1b-L151, while R1a lineages became predominant over time. The study detected a reduction in male haplogroup diversity over time, reducing from five different lineages in early CW to a single dominant lineage, R1a-M417(xZ645), in late CW. The authors suggest that males of this haplogroup had around 15% more surviving offspring per generation compared to other males, which may have been caused by "selection, social structure, or influx of nonlocal R1a-M417(xZ645) lineages." The sample included one individual ancestral to haplogroup R1b-P312, which is the most common male lineage found in individuals of the Bell Beaker culture.

==== Overview of reported CW Y-DNA haplogroups ====
An overview of reported CW Y-DNA haplogroups:

- Haak et al. (2008): three males (probably a father and his two children) from a single Corded Ware burial in Eulau, Germany carrying R1a. This study also implied patrilocality.
- Haak et al. (2015): a Corded Ware male from Esperstedt carrying R1a1a1.
- Allentoft et al. (2015): several males from the Corded Ware culture. A male from the Battle-Axe culture in Viby, Kristianstad was found to be carrying R1a1a1. A Corded Ware male of Bergrheinfeld, Germany was also found to have carried R1a1a1. A Corded Ware male of Leki Male was found to have carried R1b1a. Two Corded Ware males from Tiefbrunn, Germany were found to have carried R1 and R1b1, respectively.
- Mathieson et al. (2015): eight Corded Ware males buried in Esperstedt. Six carried R1a or various subclades of it, while two carried R.
- Saag et al. (2017): five males from the Corded Ware culture in Estonia. Four of them carried R1a-Z645, while the other carried R1a1-Z283.
- Mathieson et al. (2018): three Corded Ware males from the Czech Republic. The three were found to be carrying the paternal haplogroups R1a1a, R1a1 and I2a2a2, respectively.
- Malmström et al. (2019): two Corded Ware males; both were found to be carriers of R1a.
- Linderholm et al. (2020) report seven Polish CW males with R1b.

=== Relations with later cultures ===
A 2015 study by Allentoft et al. in Nature found the people of the Corded Ware culture to be genetically similar to the Beaker culture, the Únětice culture and the Nordic Bronze Age. (Note: "European Late Neolithic and Bronze Age cultures such as Corded Ware, Bell Beakers, Únětice, and the Scandinavian cultures are genetically very similar to each other ....") People of the Nordic Bronze Age and Corded Ware show the highest lactose tolerance among Bronze Age Europeans. (Note: "Among Bronze Age Europeans, the highest tolerance frequency was found in Corded Ware and the closely related Scandinavian Bronze Age cultures.")

The study also found a close genetic relationship between the Corded Ware culture and the Sintashta culture, suggesting that the Sintashta culture emerged as a result of an eastward expansion of Corded Ware peoples. The Sintashta culture is in turn closely genetically related to the Andronovo culture, by which it was succeeded. (Note: "The close affinity we observe between peoples of Corded Ware and Sintashta cultures suggests similar genetic sources of the two .... Although we cannot formally test whether the Sintashta derives directly from an eastward migration of Corded Ware peoples or if they share common ancestry with an earlier steppe population, the presence of European Neolithic farmer ancestry in both the Corded Ware and the Sintashta, combined with the absence of Neolithic farmer ancestry in the earlier Yamnaya, would suggest the former being more probable .... The Andronovo culture, which arose in Central Asia during the later Bronze Age, is genetically closely related to the Sintashta peoples, and clearly distinct from both Yamnaya and Afanasievo. Therefore, Andronovo represents a temporal and geographical extension of the Sintashta gene pool .... The enigmatic Sintashta culture near the Urals bears genetic resemblance to Corded Ware and was therefore likely to be an eastward migration into Asia. As this culture spread towards Altai it evolved into the Andronovo culture ....") Many cultural similarities between the Sintashta/Andronovo culture, the Nordic Bronze Age and the people of the Rigveda have been detected. (Note: "There are many similarities between Sintasthta/Androvono rituals and those described in the Rig Veda and such similarities even extend as far as to the Nordic Bronze Age.")

Narasimhan et al. (2019) found the Sintashta culture, the Potapovka culture, the Andronovo culture and the Srubnaya culture to be closely related to the Corded Ware culture. (Note: "We observed a main cluster of Sintashta individuals that was similar to Srubnaya, Potapovka, and Andronovo in being well modeled as a mixture of Yamnaya-related and Anatolian Neolithic (European agriculturalist-related) ancestry.") (Note: "Genetic analysis indicates that the individuals in our study classified as falling within the Andronovo complex are genetically similar to the main clusters of Potapovka, Sintashta, and Srubnaya in being well modeled as a mixture of Yamnaya-related and early European agriculturalist-related or Anatolian agriculturalist-related ancestry.") These cultures were found to harbor mixed ancestry from the Yamnaya culture and peoples of the Middle Neolithic of Central Europe. The genetic data suggested that these cultures were ultimately derived of a remigration of Central European peoples with steppe ancestry back into the steppe. (Note: "Corded Ware, Srubnaya, Petrovka, Sintashta and Andronovo complexes, all of which harbored a mixture of Steppe_EMBA ancestry and ancestry from European Middle Neolithic agriculturalists (Europe_MN). This is consistent with previous findings showing that following westward movement of eastern European populations and mixture with local European agriculturalists, there was an eastward reflux back beyond the Urals.")

== See also ==
- Battle Axe culture
- Funnelbeaker culture
- Fatyanovo–Balanovo culture
- Middle Dnieper culture
- Bell Beaker culture
- Ertebølle culture

== Sources ==
- Allentoft, M. E. (11 June 2015). "Population genomics of Bronze Age Eurasia". Nature. 522 (7555). Nature Research: 167–172. Bibcode:2015Natur.522..167A. doi:10.1038/nature14507. PMID 26062507. S2CID 4399103.
- Anthony, David W. (2007). The Horse, the Wheel, and Language: How Bronze-Age riders from the Eurasian steppes shaped the modern world. Princeton University Press.
- Furtwängler, Anja (2020), "Ancient genomes reveal social and genetic structure of Late Neolithic Switzerland", Nature Communications, 11 (1) 1915, Bibcode:2020NatCo..11.1915F, doi:10.1038/s41467-020-15560-x, PMC 7171184, PMID 32313080, S2CID 215819621
- Gimbutas, Marija (1997). Dexter, Miriam Robbins; Jones-Bley, Karlene (eds.). The Kurgan culture and the Indo-Europeanization of Europe: Selected articles from 1952 to 1993. Washington, DC: Institute for the Study of Man. ISBN 978-0-941694-56-8.
- Haak, Wolfgang (25 November 2008). Klein, Richard G. (ed.). "Ancient DNA, Strontium isotopes, and osteological analyses shed light on social and kinship organization of the Later Stone Age". Proceedings of the National Academy of Sciences of the United States of America. 105 (47). National Academy of Sciences: 18226–18231. Bibcode:2008PNAS..10518226H. doi:10.1073/pnas.0807592105. ISSN 1091-6490. PMC 2587582. PMID 19015520.
- Haak, Wolfgang; et al. (11 June 2015). "Massive migration from the steppe was a source for Indo-European languages in Europe". Nature. 522 (7555). Nature Research: 207–211. arXiv:1502.02783. Bibcode:2015Natur.522..207H. doi:10.1038/nature14317. PMC 5048219. PMID 25731166.
- Heyd, Volker (2017). "Kossinna's smile" (PDF). Antiquity. 91 (356): 348–359. doi:10.15184/aqy.2017.21. hdl:10138/255652. S2CID 164376362.
- Iversen, Rune; Kroonen, Guus (2017). "Talking Neolithic: Linguistic and Archaeological Perspectives on how Indo-European was Implemented in Southern Scandinavia" (PDF). American Journal of Archaeology. 121 (4): 511–525. doi:10.3764/aja.121.4.0511. hdl:1887/72458. S2CID 4811514.
- Kristiansen, Kristian; Allentoft, Morten; Frei, Karin M. (2017). "Re-theorising mobility and the formation of culture and language among the Corded Ware Culture in Europe". Antiquity. 91 (356): 334–347. doi:10.15184/aqy.2017.17. hdl:1887/70150.
- Lazaridis, Iosif (17 September 2014). "Ancient human genomes suggest three ancestral populations for present-day Europeans". Nature. 513 (7518). Nature Research: 409–413. arXiv:1312.6639. Bibcode:2014Natur.513..409L. doi:10.1038/nature13673. hdl:11336/30563. PMC 4170574. PMID 25230663.
- Lazaridis, Iosif; Haak, Wolfgang; Patterson, Nick; Anthony, David; Reich, David (2015). "Supplementary Information 11. Relevance of ancient DNA to the problem of Indo-European language dispersals". Massive migration from the steppe is a source for Indo-European languages in Europe.
- Linderholm, Anna (2020), "Corded Ware cultural complexity uncovered using genomic and isotopic analysis from south-eastern Poland", Scientific Reports, 10 (1) 6885, Bibcode:2020NatSR..10.6885L, doi:10.1038/s41598-020-63138-w, PMC 7165176, PMID 32303690
- Lindquist, H. (1993). Historien om Sverige (in Swedish).
- Malmström, Helena (9 October 2019). "The genomic ancestry of the Scandinavian Battle Axe Culture people and their relation to the broader Corded Ware horizon". Proceedings of the Royal Society B. 286 (1912). Royal Society. doi:10.1098/rspb.2019.1528. PMC 6790770. PMID 31594508.
- Mallory, J. P. (1997). Encyclopedia of Indo-European Culture. Taylor & Francis. ISBN 978-1-884964-98-5.
- Mallory, J. P. (1999). In Search of the Indo-Europeans (freprint ed.). Thames and Hudson.
- Mathieson, Iain (23 November 2015). "Genome-wide patterns of selection in 230 ancient Eurasians". Nature. 528 (7583). Nature Research: 499–503. Bibcode:2015Natur.528..499M. doi:10.1038/nature16152. PMC 4918750. PMID 26595274.
- Mathieson, Iain (21 February 2018). "The Genomic History of Southeastern Europe". Nature. 555 (7695). Nature Research: 197–203. Bibcode:2018Natur.555..197M. doi:10.1038/nature25778. PMC 6091220. PMID 29466330.
- Narasimhan, Vagheesh M. (6 September 2019). "The formation of human populations in South and Central Asia". Science. 365 (6457) eaat7487. American Association for the Advancement of Science. Bibcode:2019Sci...365t7487N. bioRxiv 10.1101/292581. doi:10.1126/science.aat7487. PMC 6822619. PMID 31488661.
- Olalde, I. (21 February 2018). "The Beaker phenomenon and the genomic transformation of northwest Europe". Nature. 555 (7695). Nature Research: 190–196. Bibcode:2018Natur.555..190O. doi:10.1038/nature25738. PMC 5973796. PMID 29466337.
- Østmo, Einar (1996). "The Indo-European question: A Norwegian perspective". In Huld, Martin E.; Jones-Bley, Karlene (eds.). The Indo-Europeanization of Northern Europe. Journal of Indo-European Studies Monograph. Washington, D.C.: Institute for the Study of Man. pp. 23–41.
- Papac, Luka; et al. (2021). "Dynamic changes in genomic and social structures in third millennium BC central Europe". Science Advances. 7 (35) eabi6941. Bibcode:2021SciA....7.6941P. doi:10.1126/sciadv.abi6941. ISSN 2375-2548. PMC 8386934. PMID 34433570.
- Saag, Lehti (24 July 2017). "Extensive Farming in Estonia Started through a Sex-Biased Migration from the Steppe". Current Biology. 27 (14). Cell Press: 2185–2193. Bibcode:2017CBio...27E2185S. doi:10.1016/j.cub.2017.06.022. PMID 28712569.
- Sjögren, Karl-Göran (2020), "Kinship and social organization in Copper Age Europe. A cross-disciplinary analysis of archaeology, DNA, isotopes, and anthropology from two Bell Beaker cemeteries", PLOS ONE, 15 (11) e0241278, Bibcode:2020PLoSO..1541278S, doi:10.1371/journal.pone.0241278, PMC 7668604, PMID 33196640
