= Netted Ware culture =

Archaeological culture in northeastern Europe

- Alternative names: Textile Ceramic culture
- Geographical range: Finland, northwestern Russia
- Period: Bronze Age
- Dates: 1900 BCE – 500 BCE
- Preceded by: Volosovo culture

The Netted Ware culture (also called Textile Ceramic culture) was a Bronze Age culture in northeastern Europe that extended from Finland to the upper Volga region in Russia.

== Origins ==
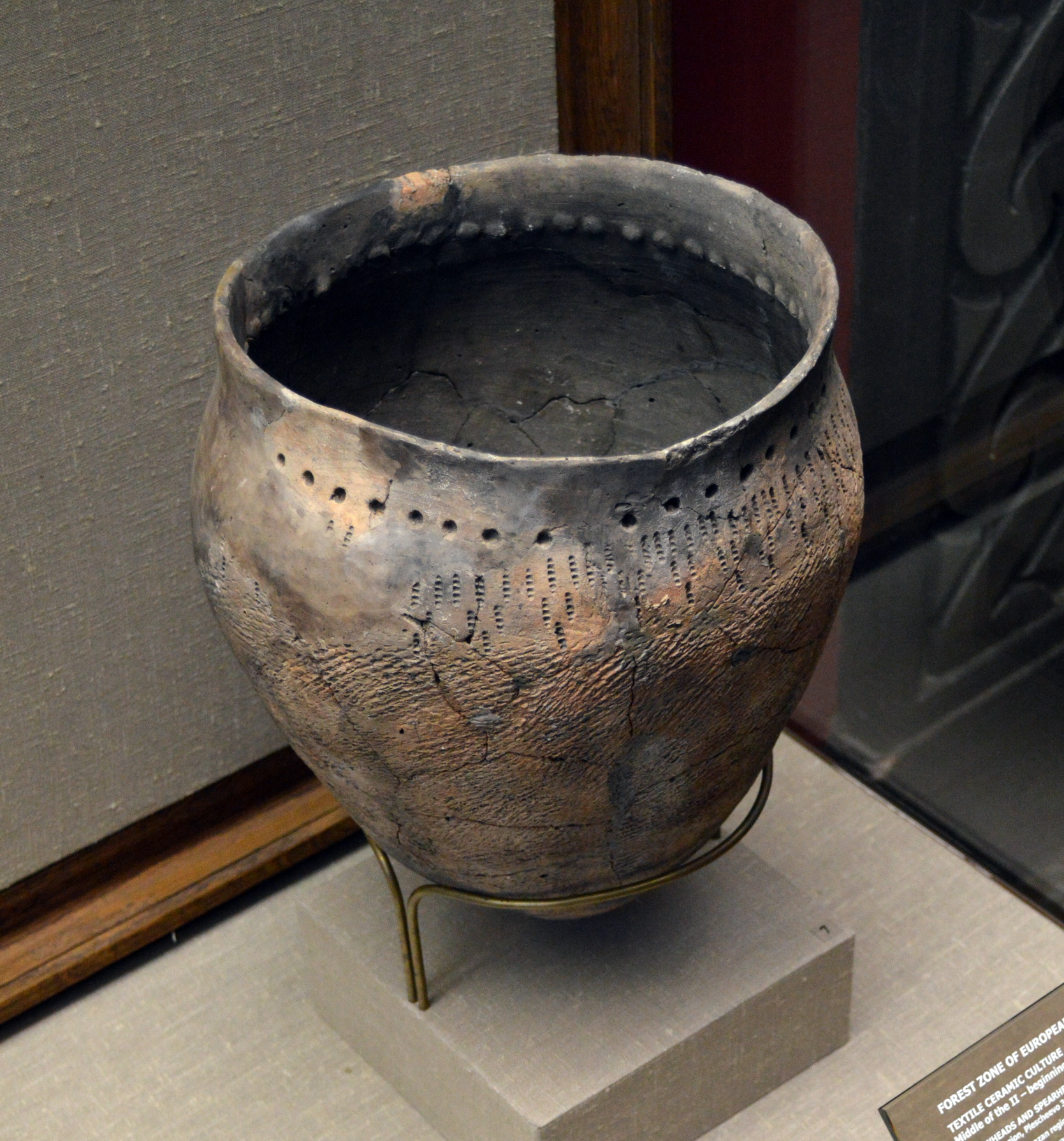
Netted Ware clay vessel from Ryazan Oblast.

The Netted Ware culture emerged around 1900 BCE with the arrival of the Seima-Turbino phenomenon in the upper Volga region, replacing the earlier Volosovo cultures, and soon expanded to the west to Karelia and eastern and central Finland. The Netted Ware culture did not reach southwestern Finland, the area of the Kiukainen culture and later the Nordic Bronze culture. The subsistence of the Netted Ware culture was based on small-scale swidden agriculture and animal husbandry.

== Hypothetical linguistic affiliation ==
The spread of the Netted Ware culture has been linked to the dispersal of early forms of the Finno-Volgaic languages, especially Finnic languages and Saami languages.
