= Volosovo culture =

Neolithic–Bronze Age archaeological culture of Central Russia

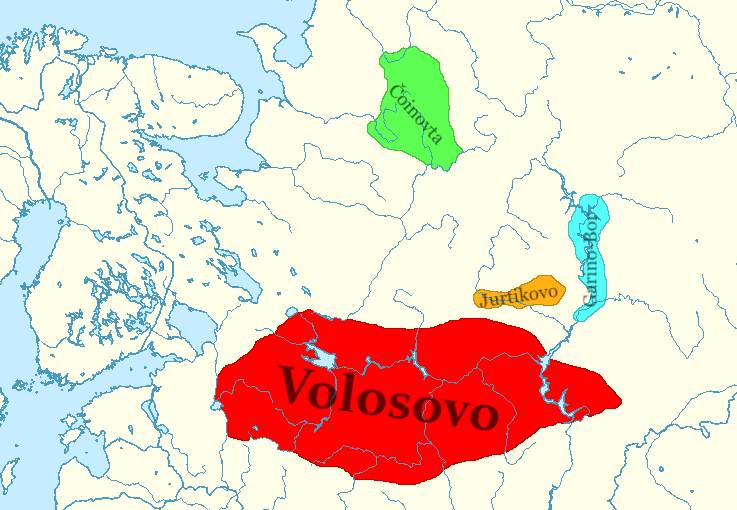
- Geographical range: North-Central Russia, Volga region
- Period: Neolithic to early Bronze Age
- Dates: 4000-2000 BC or 1800-1500 BC
- Major sites: Volga, Kama, Oka River, Veletma River
- Preceded by: Balakhna culture, Lyalovo culture
- Followed by: Garino-Bor, Netted Ware culture

The Volosovo culture (Russian: Волосовская культура, romanized: Volosovskaya kul'tura) is an archaeological culture that followed the Neolithic Pit-marked pottery culture (Balakhna). The archaeological assemblage identified with this culture is related to finds from the middle Volga and Kama basin.

The Volosovo culture emerged sometime between the third and fourth millennium B.C. and lasted until the second millennium BC. The people of the Volosovo culture has been described as forest foragers.

== Discovery ==
The Volosovo culture was discovered in the 1900s. Like other groups with forest origin such as the Garino-Bor and other northern cultures, the Volosovo lived in the forest steppes of the Volga-Ural region, particularly the area of the present-day Samara oblast. Specific sites include those in central Russia, the Middle and Lower Oka, Lower Kama, and Middle Volga. The culture also inhabited the Veletma River area adjacent to Murom, a city that is part of Vladimir Oblast. The Veletma River site was excavated from 1877 to 1928.

Since the discovery of the Volosovo culture, it has been investigated extensively but it remains controversial due to some unresolved aspects, particularly the chronology of its history, cultural attributes, origin, and ethnic affiliations. For example, it was believed that Volosovo was a separate cultural entity but other studies show that it is related to cultures associated with the Volga and Kama basin.

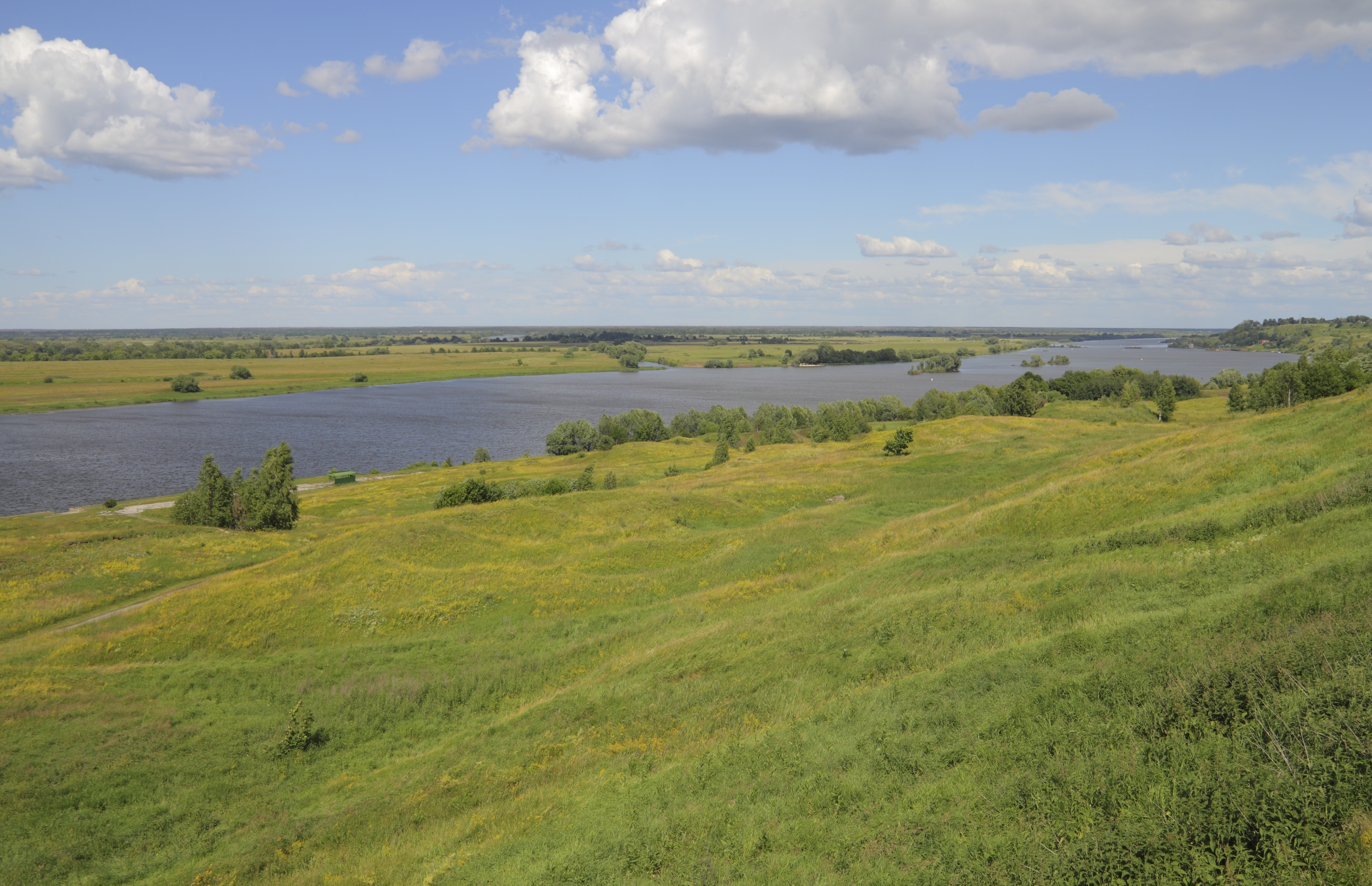
The habitations of the Volosovo culture were often found within the vicinity of lakes and rivers such as the Oka River.

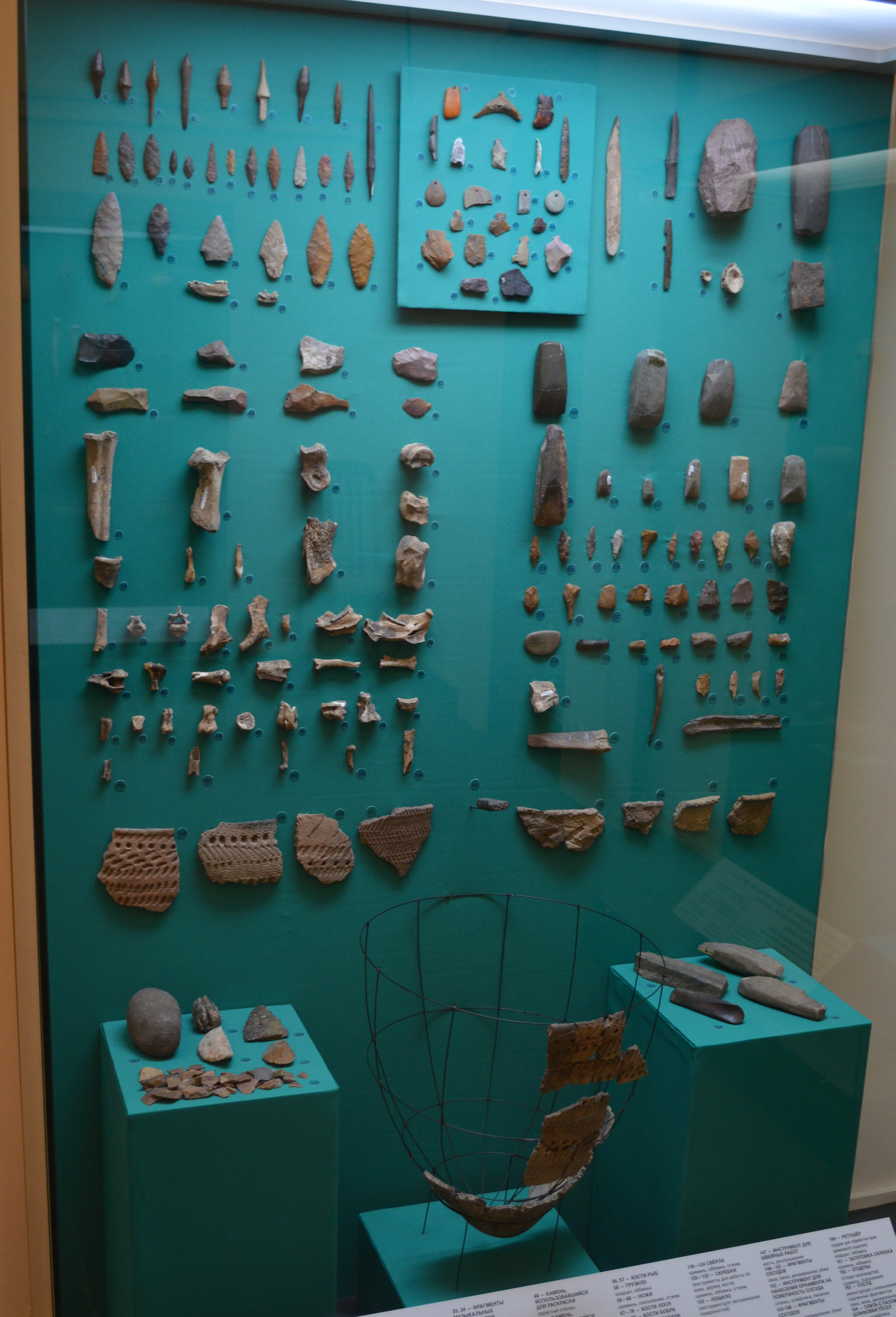
Volosovo culture artefacts

== Characteristics ==
Excavated remains show that the morphological characteristics of the people of the Volosovo culture are craniologically related to the Lapponoid group. The stone and ceramic artifacts that are used to describe the Volosovo culture were from the semi subterranean dwellings, which are often situated in river floors and within the area of lakes. These dwellings have lower and upper cultural layers. The artifacts found in the lower layer indicates a cultural affinity with the Russian Pit-marked Pottery culture called Balakhna. The upper level, which is considered the actual Volosovo phase, included ceramics that were distinct from the pit-marked pottery as well as those attributed to the Fatyanovo culture.

Based on excavated artifacts, the Volosovo culture first used stones and bone tools and were particularly adept at bone carving and sculpture. A small art emerged, one that has been considered rich and diverse as demonstrated by the varied flaked flint sculptures that represented the human form. This phenomenon was distinguished from what manifested in the Tokareva culture.

The Volosovo c. transitioned out of the Neolithic Age and abandoned its stone and bone technologies after learning early metal working. Later in its development, an early form of agriculture emerged with evidence of domestic animals. Discovered cranial and long bones of a primitive turbary dog, for example, showed improved animal breeding. However, the culture still favored foraging, hunting, and fishing. It is suggested that there emerged an animal cult among the Volosovo population after 1500 BCE as evidenced by the use of animal teeth and bones on ornaments such as necklaces. According to this theory, bears were worshiped for their power while dogs and pigs were revered for their economic value.

A late Volosovo culture emerged later on and this phase was associated with the sites located in the upper Volodary and Panfilovo. The Garino-Bor culture and the Netted Ware culture are considered offshoots of the Volosovo culture that settled in the Volga-Oka region. Experts identify a Volosovo-Garino cultural province, which is characterized by a distinct comb-ware ceramic tradition.

According to the archaeologist Valentin Sedov, the names of rivers that end in -sha and -xa, particularly those situated in the right bank of the Oka and the White and Barents Seas originated in the Volosovo culture.

== Cultural contacts ==
There is evidence that the Volosovo culture had extensive contacts with other cultures such as the Balanovo culture, a group considered to be the metal-working aspect of the eastern Fatyanovo. This is also demonstrated by the existence of Fatyanovo ceramics in Volosovo sites as well as the discovery of Volosovo ceramics in Fatyanovo graves. Volosovo's contact with the Balanovo culture, for instance, was considered a symbiotic relationship. There are sources, however, that cite how the Volosovo hunters and fishers competed with the Fatyanovo people in the lower Oka and Kljazma river basins. Evidence showed that the late Volosovo phase also had extensive contact with the Abashevo population, helping spread cattle-breeding economies as well as metallurgy among the northern forest cultures. There were also Volosovo populations that were absorbed into the Abashevo culture before 2500 BCE while others were moving north.

It is speculated that the Volosovo people maintained contacts with linguistic relatives (Proto-Baltic speakers) who settled in Finland and Russian Karelia and were later absorbed into the culture.
