= Latvian pottery =

Traditional Latvian ceramic works

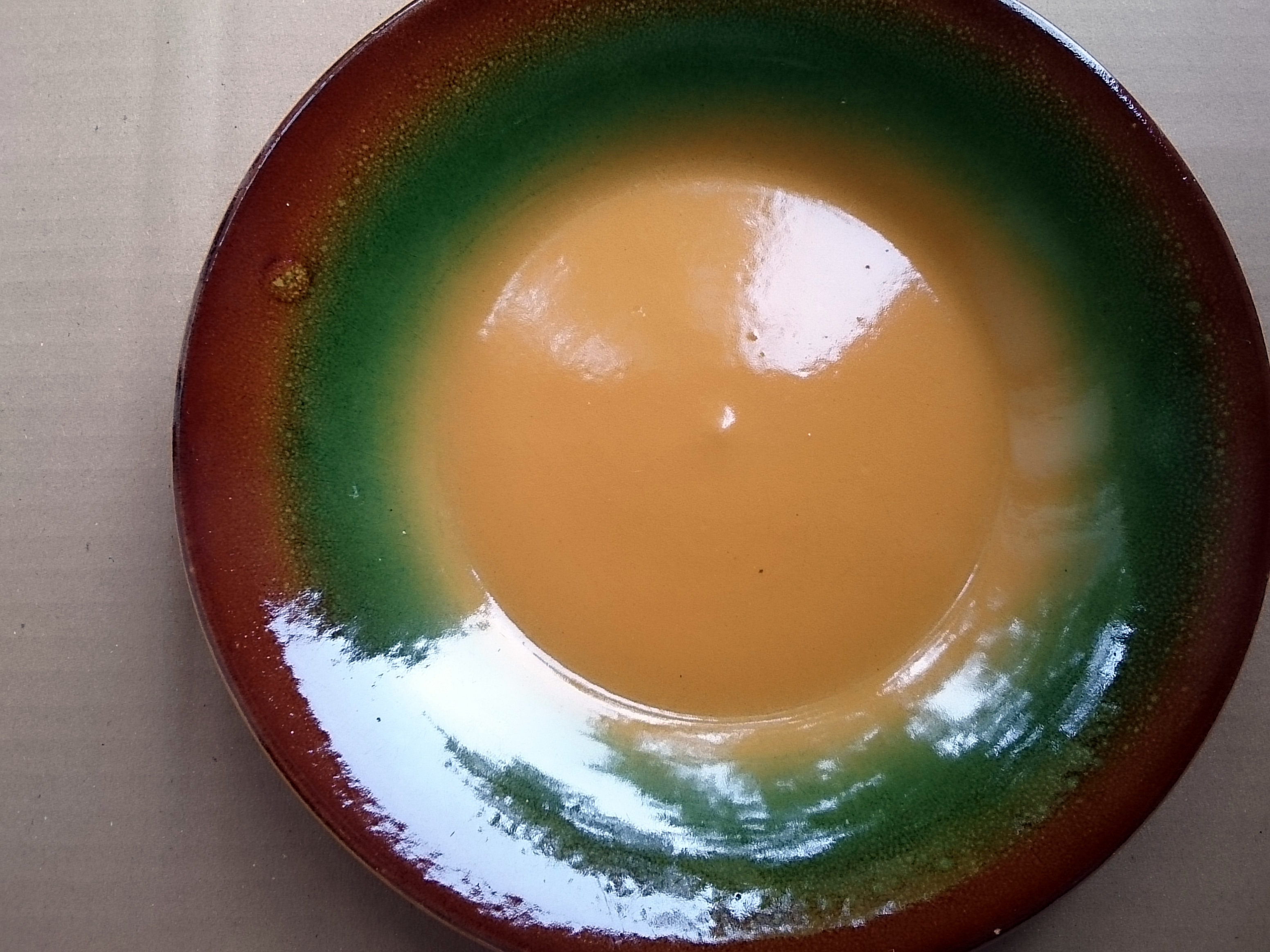

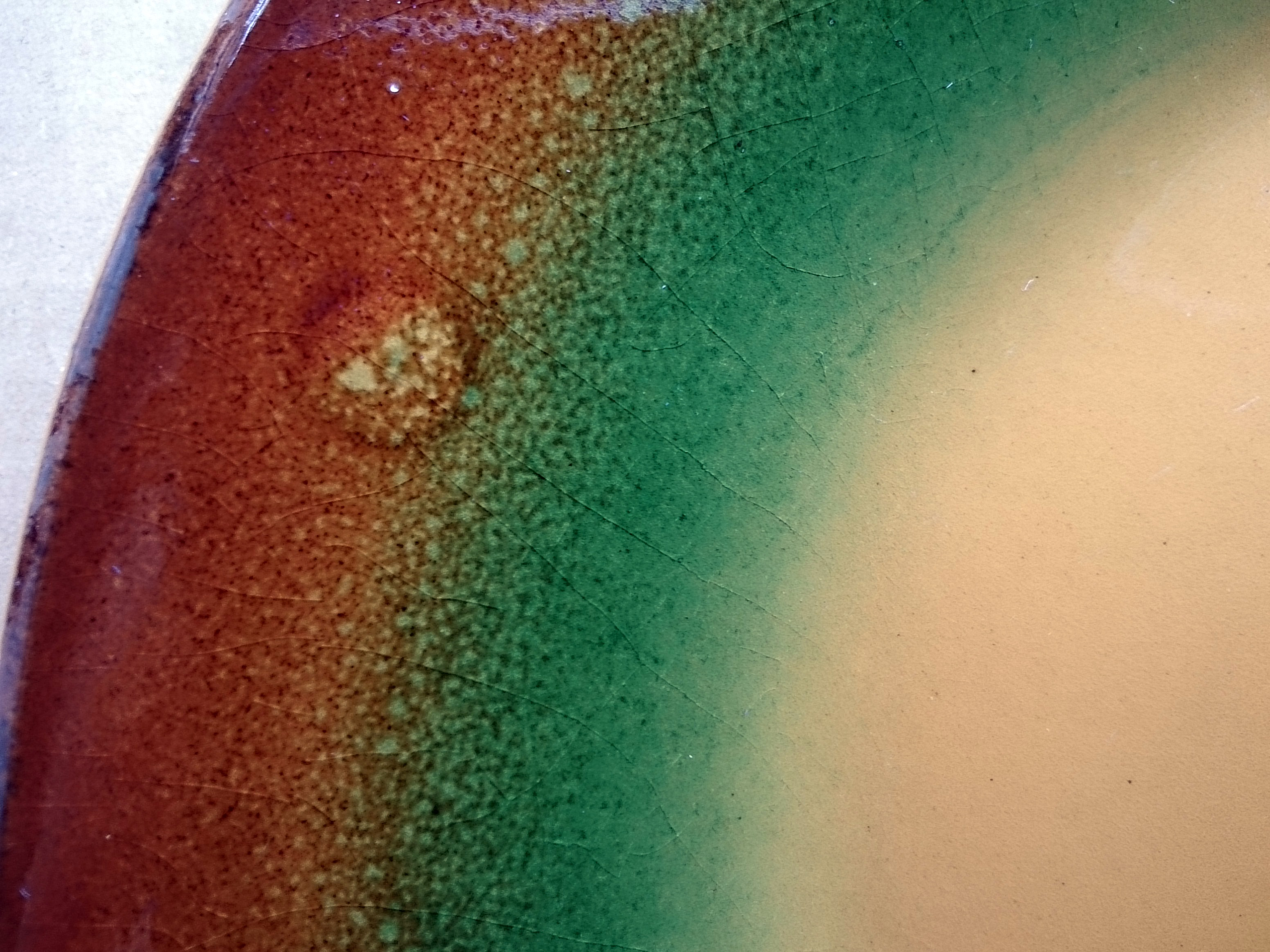

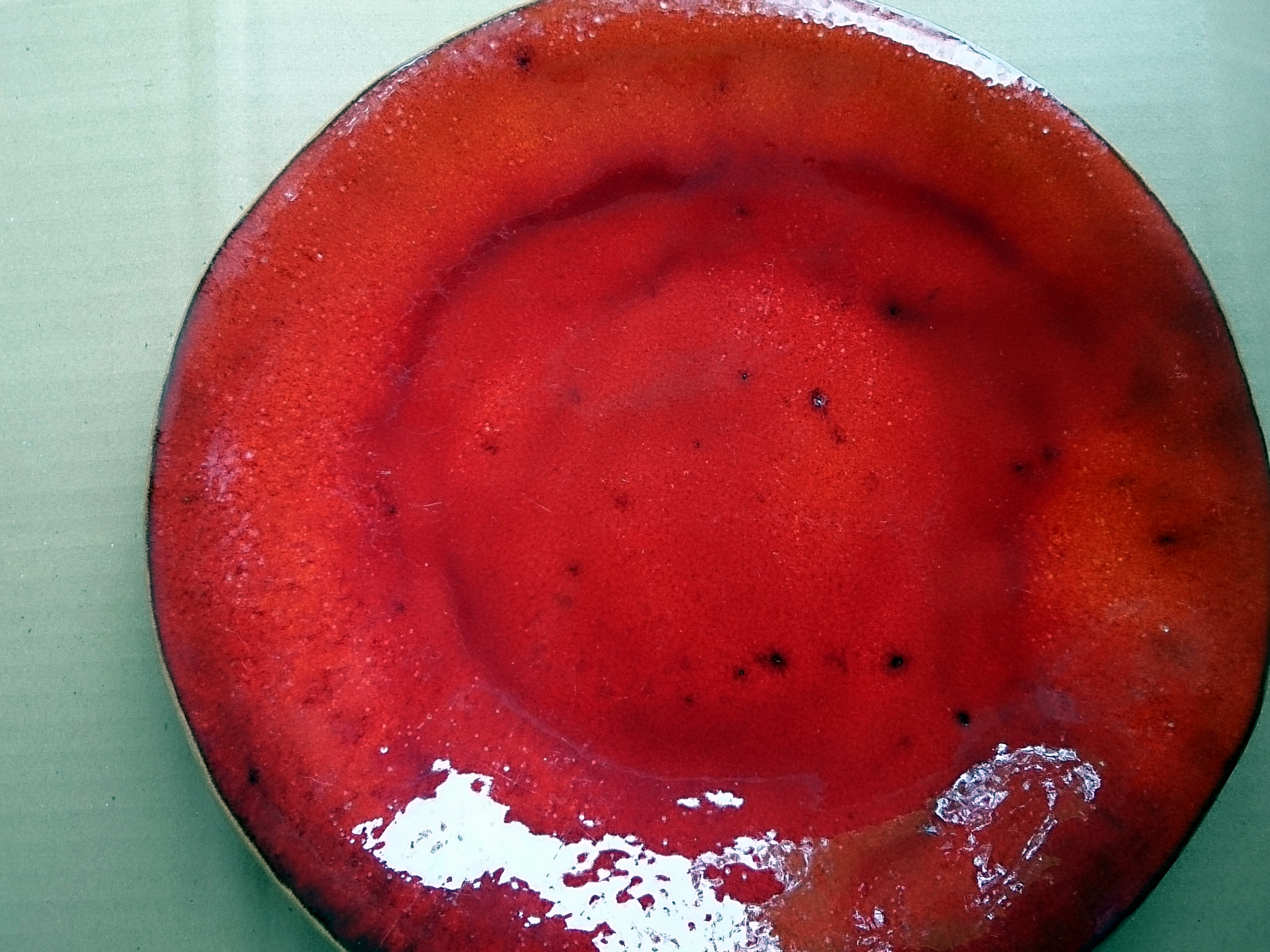

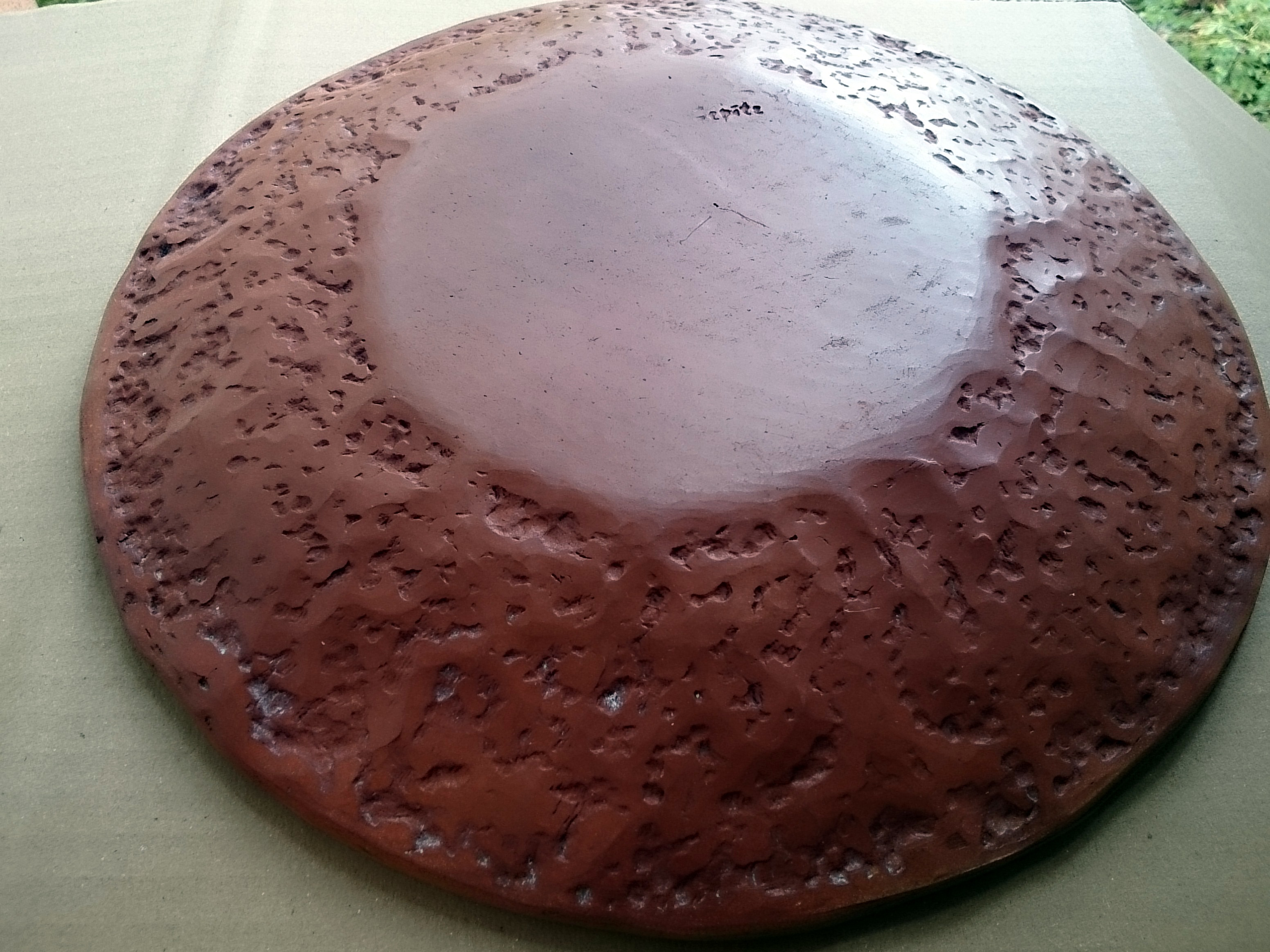

Top: a traditional Latvian plate, mottling detail
Bottom: a piece by Ingrīda Cepīte, shaped without using potter's wheel

Latvian pottery (Latvian: Latvijas podniecība) or Latvian ceramics (Latvijas keramika) is one of the country's oldest art forms, dating back to the Neolithic. The best-known subset of Latvian pottery is Latgalian pottery (Latgalian: Latgolys pūdnīceiba, Latvian: Latgales podniecība). The eastern region of Latgale is the most prolific producer of wares.

As a rule, Latvian pottery is characterized by an absence of any painted-on patterns or designs, instead, solid colours and gradients are used. Traditionally subdued, earthen hues (greens, browns, etc.) are used; however, artisans can be seen using brighter colours in their unique pieces. Mottled glaze and random artefacts (somewhat reminiscent of the Japanese Shino-yaki) are characteristic of Latvian pottery.

== Prehistoric period ==
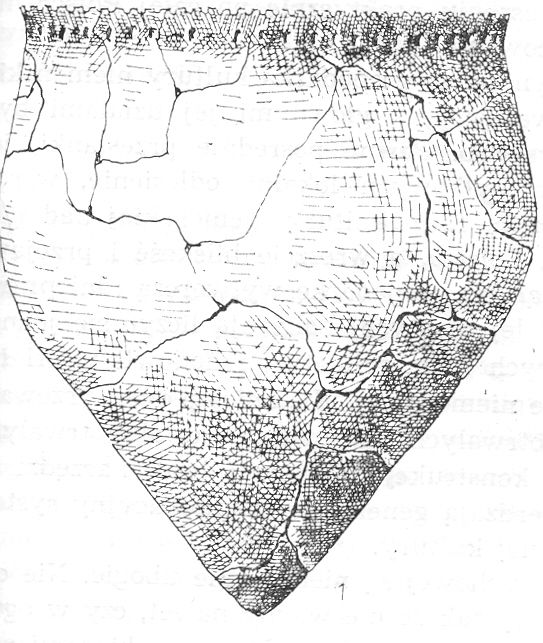
Pottery of the Narva culture

Neolithic Europe, Pit–Comb Ware culture in purple

The Neolithic Pit–Comb Ware culture (a.k.a. Comb Ceramic culture) that spanned the entire territory of modern-day Latvia derives its name from the pottery characteristic of the time – wares decorated with impressions of a comb-like object. Narva culture spanning the entire territory of modern-day Estonia and Latvia, as well as parts of Lithuania and Western Russia, is a subset of the larger Pit–Comb Ware culture.

Pit–Comb Ware culture is usually thought to have used an early form of what are today known as the Uralic languages, a competing view is that they may have been speakers of a Paleo-European language.

== Latgalian pottery ==
Some of the types of wares characteristic to Latgale pottery are vāraunieks (a pot for cooking), medaunieks (a pot for honey storage), sloinīks (a pot for storing fruit preserves), ķērne (a pot for storing sour cream), ļaks (a vessel for storage of oil), piena pods (a pot for storing cow's milk), kazelnieks (a pot for goat milk storage), pārosis (lit. "over-handle", a vessel for bringing food to the field), bļoda (bowl), krūze (a jug or a mug, most often for beer or milk).

Some Latgale pottery wares are not food-related, these include human, animal, folk figure shaped ocarinas (sviļpaunīki), candlesticks (svečturi) and decorative plates and possibly other items meeting more contemporary demands, for example, ashtrays.

=== Gallery ===
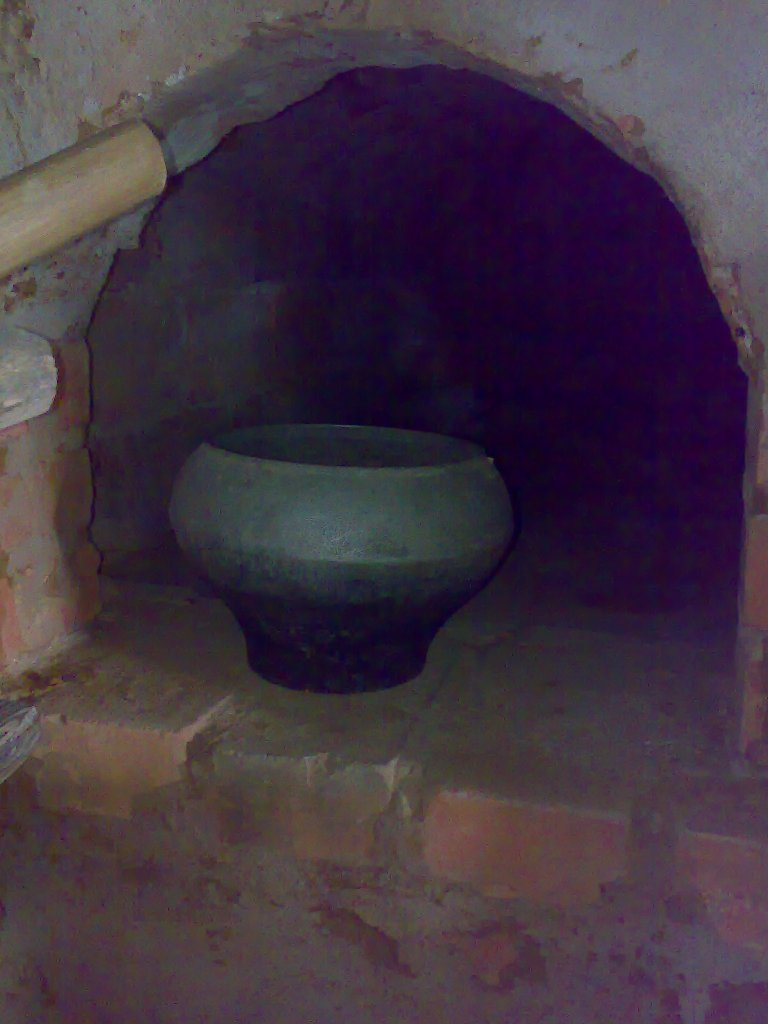
A metallic replica of a vāraunieks to demonstrate its form

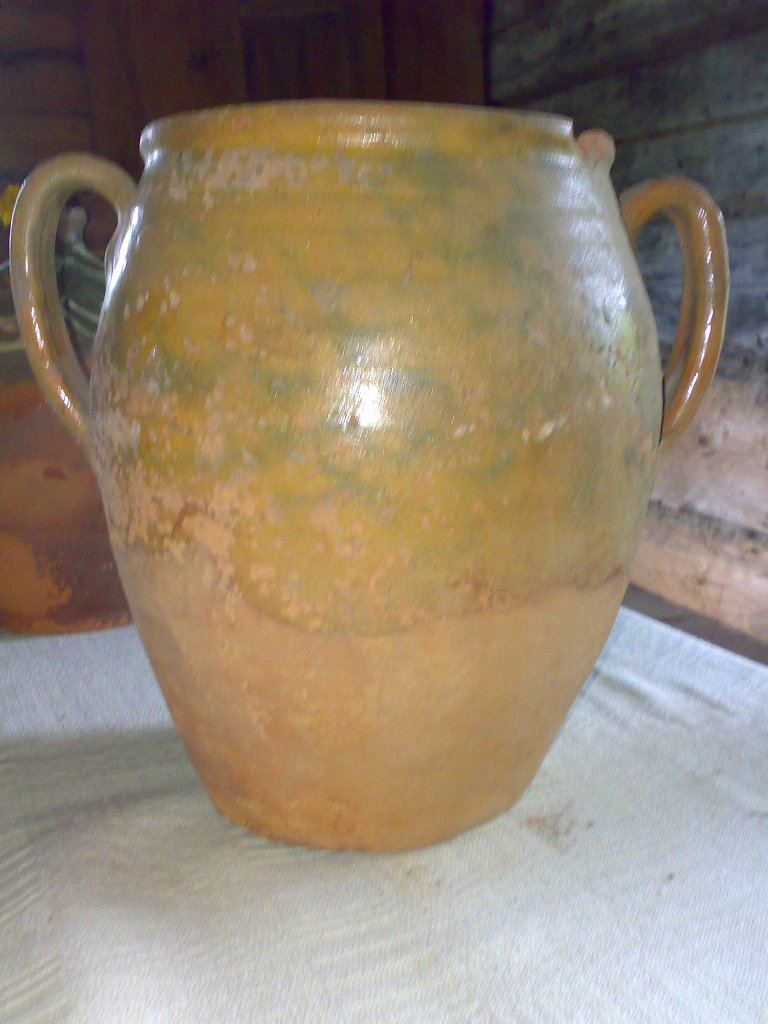
Medaunieks

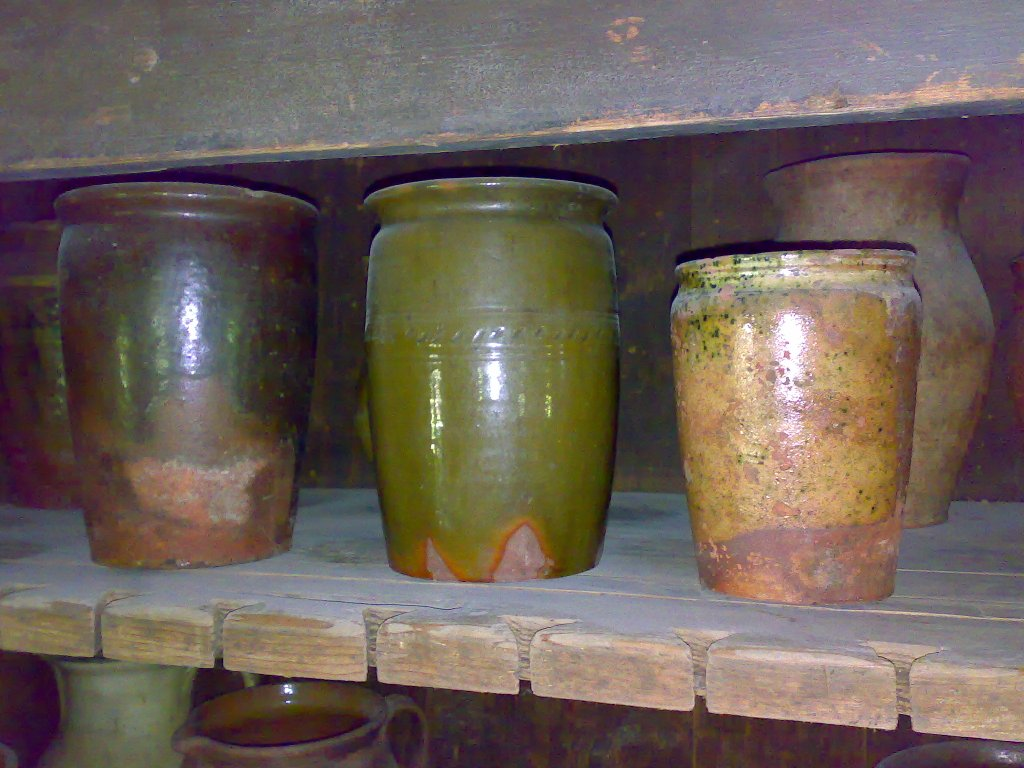
Sloinīki

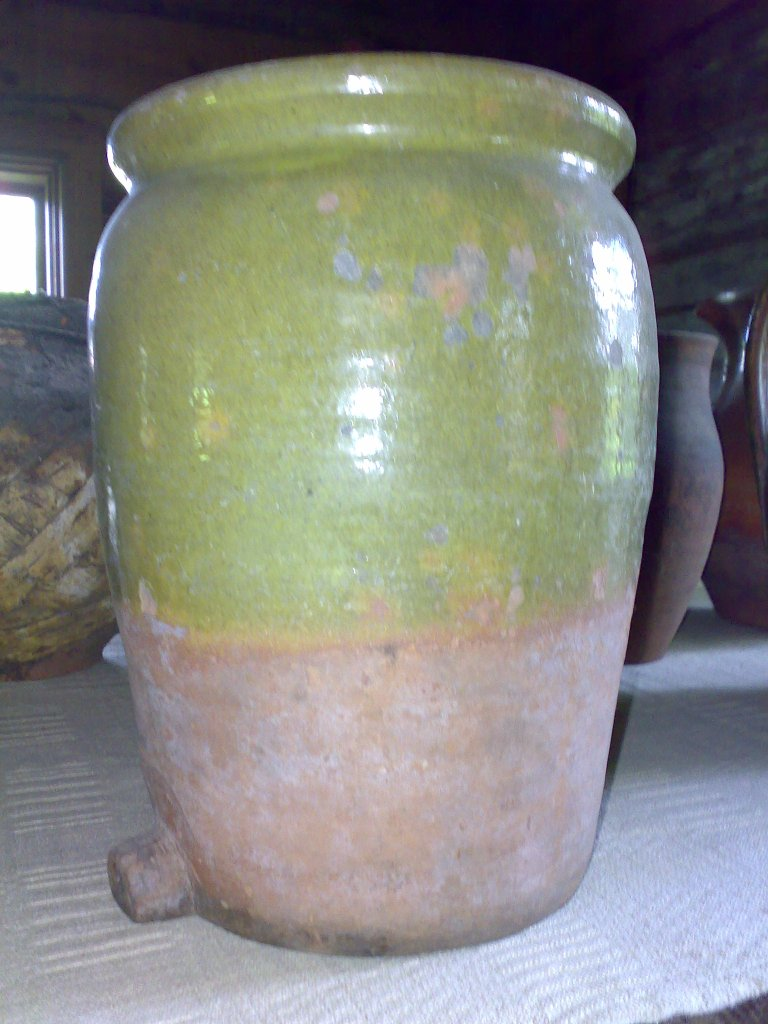
Ķērne

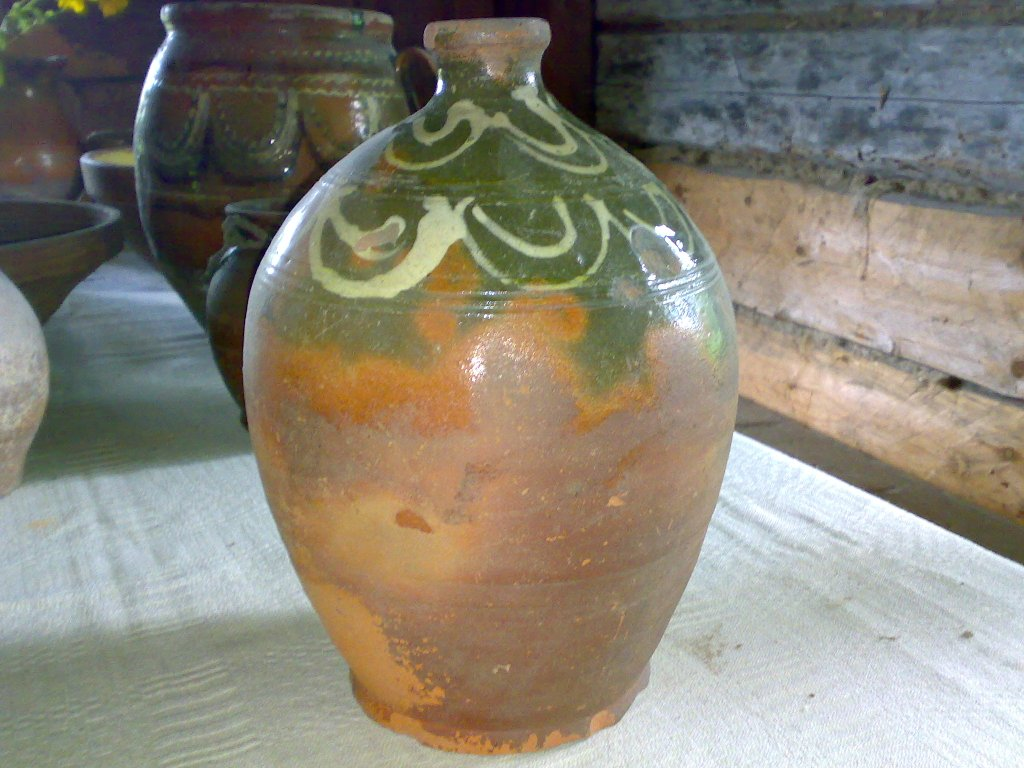
Ļaks

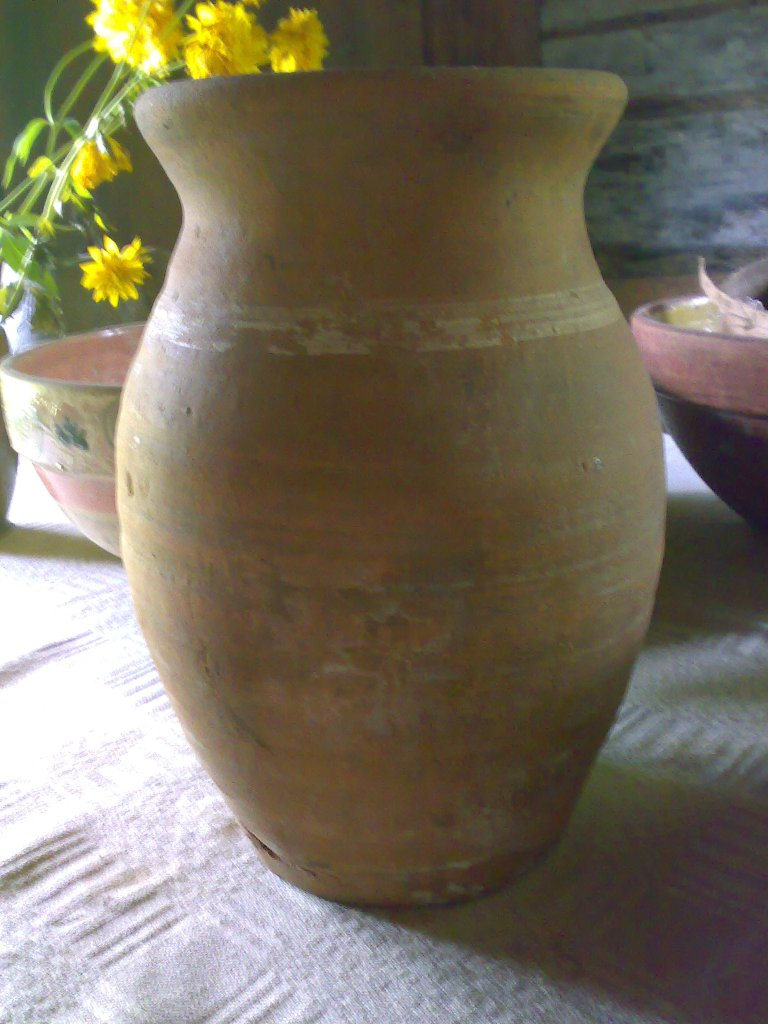
Piena pods

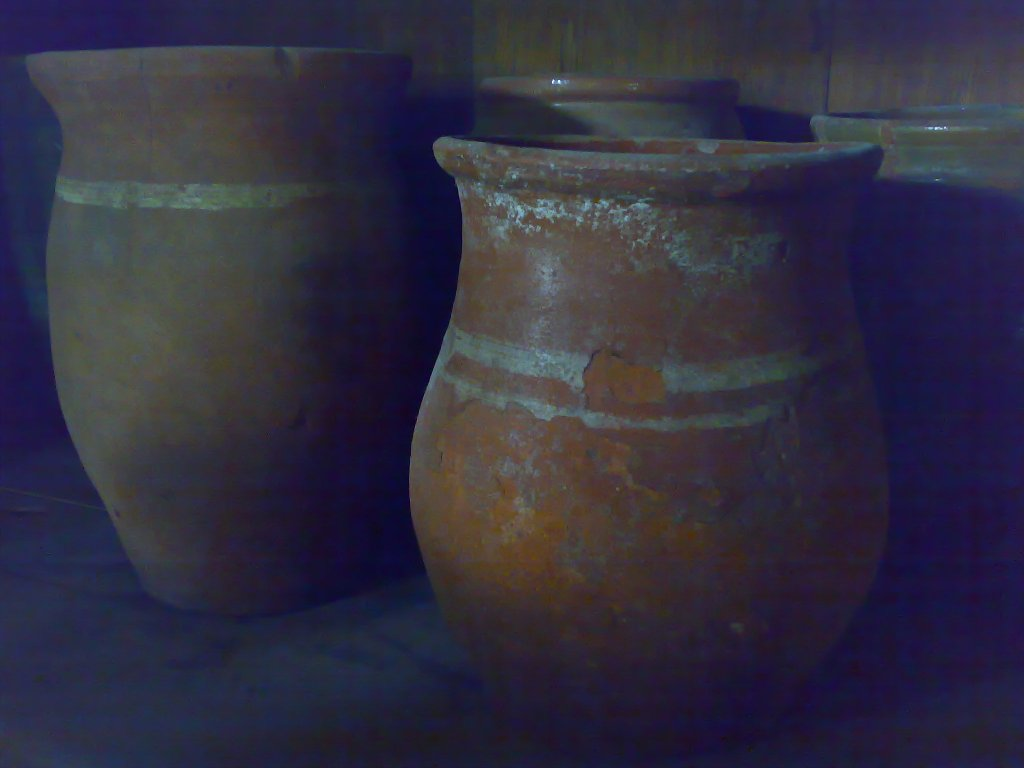
Kazelnieki

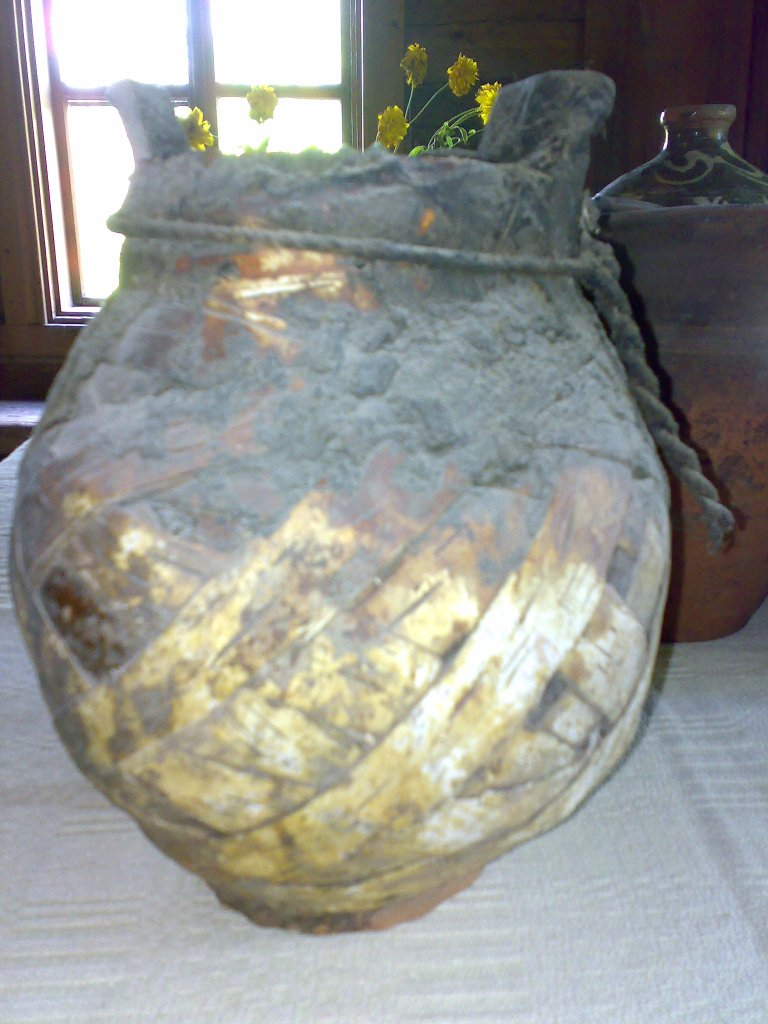
Pārosis in birch bark for protection, its handle is missing

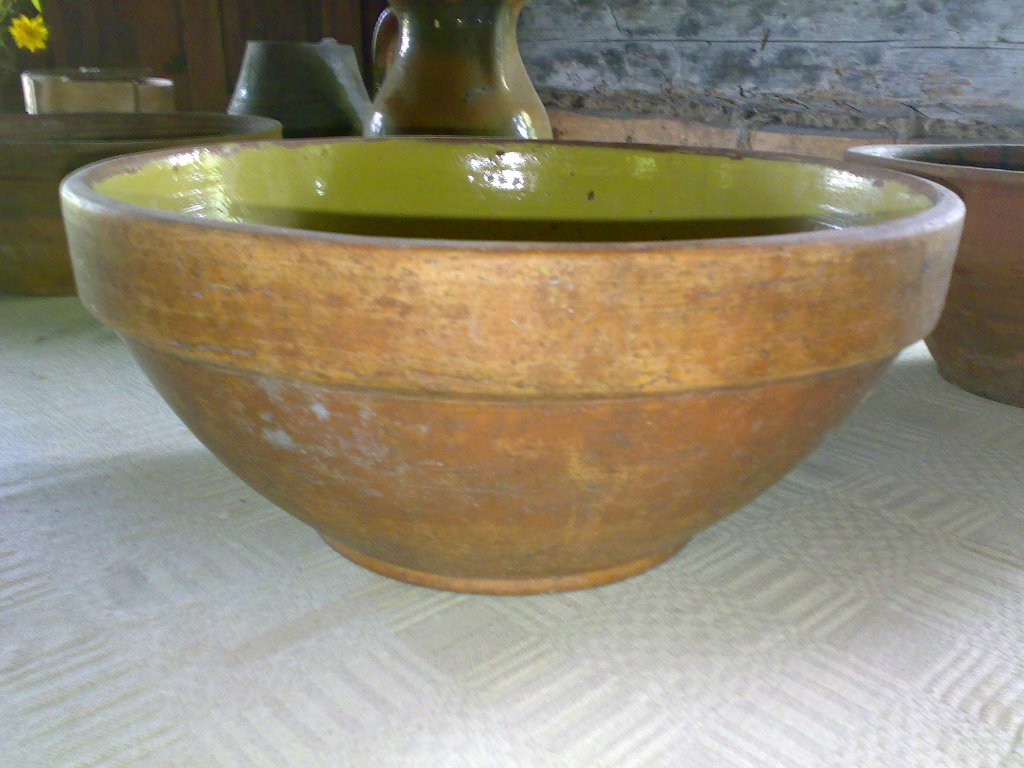
Bļoda

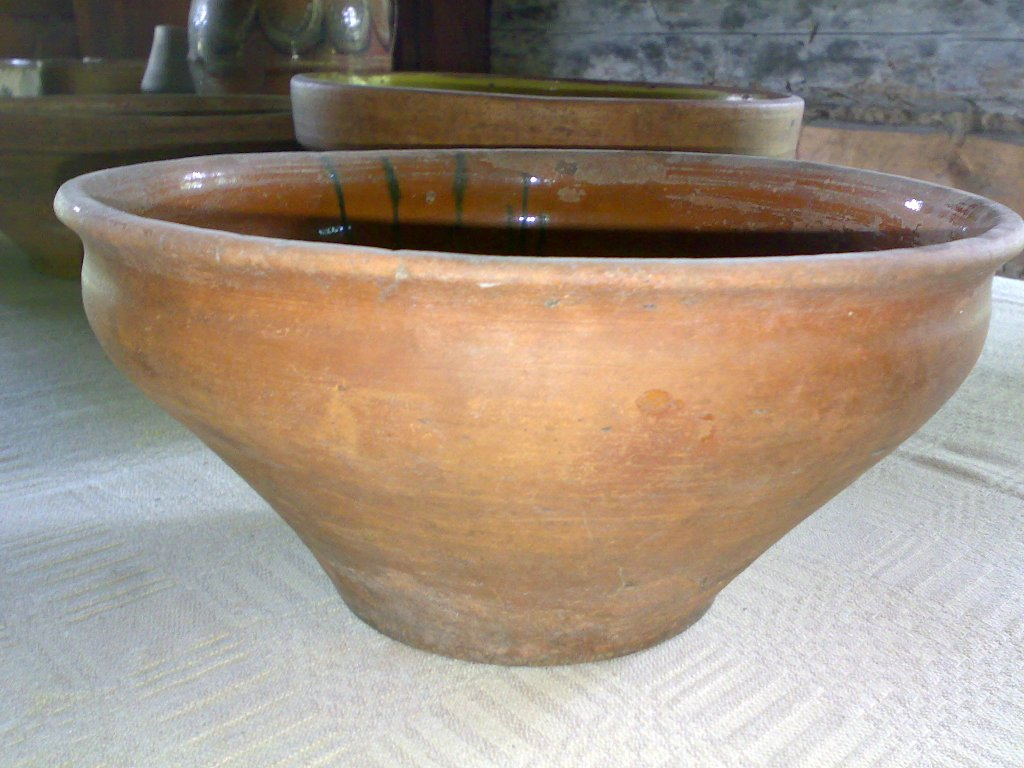
Bļoda

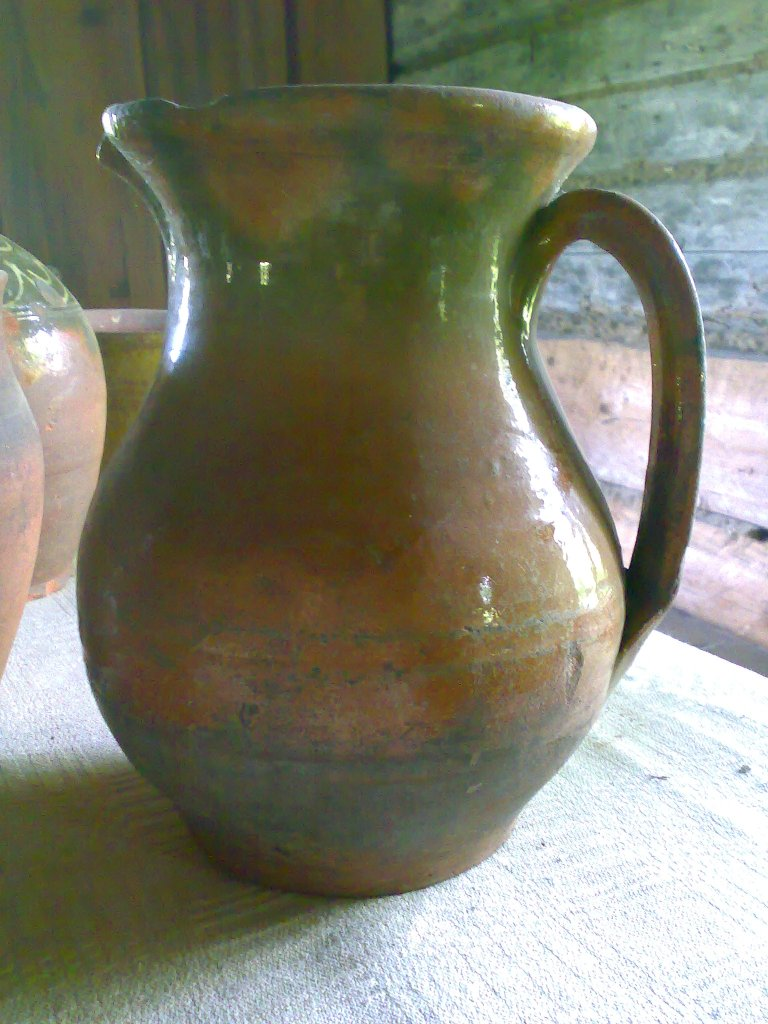
Large krūze

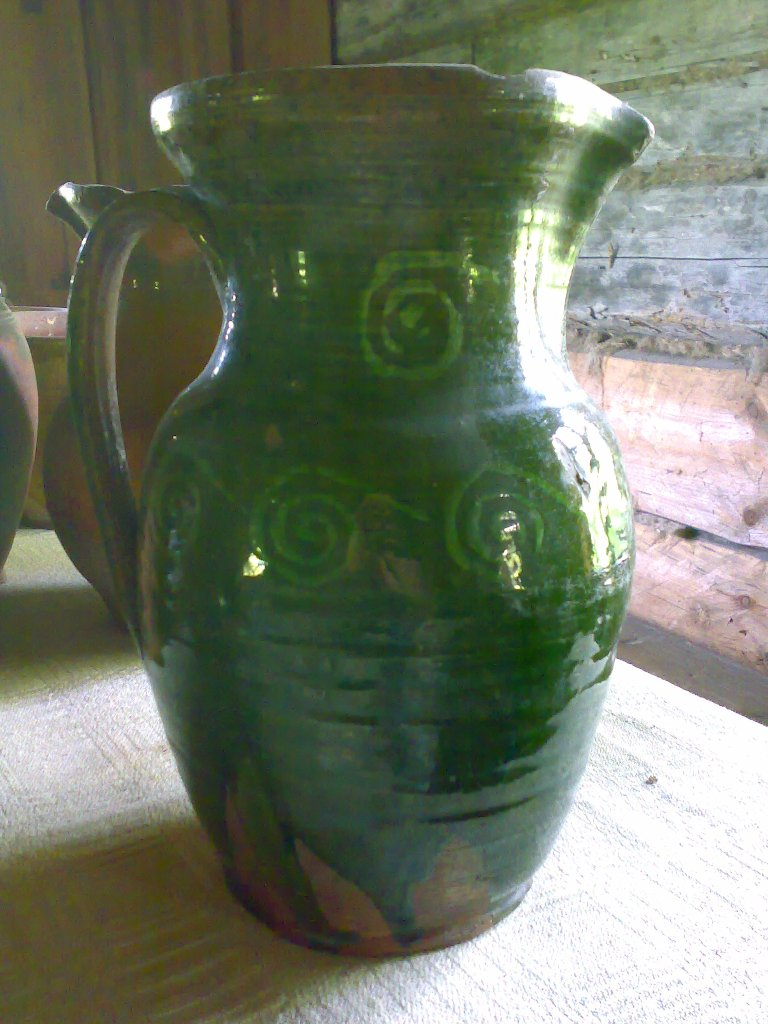
Large krūze

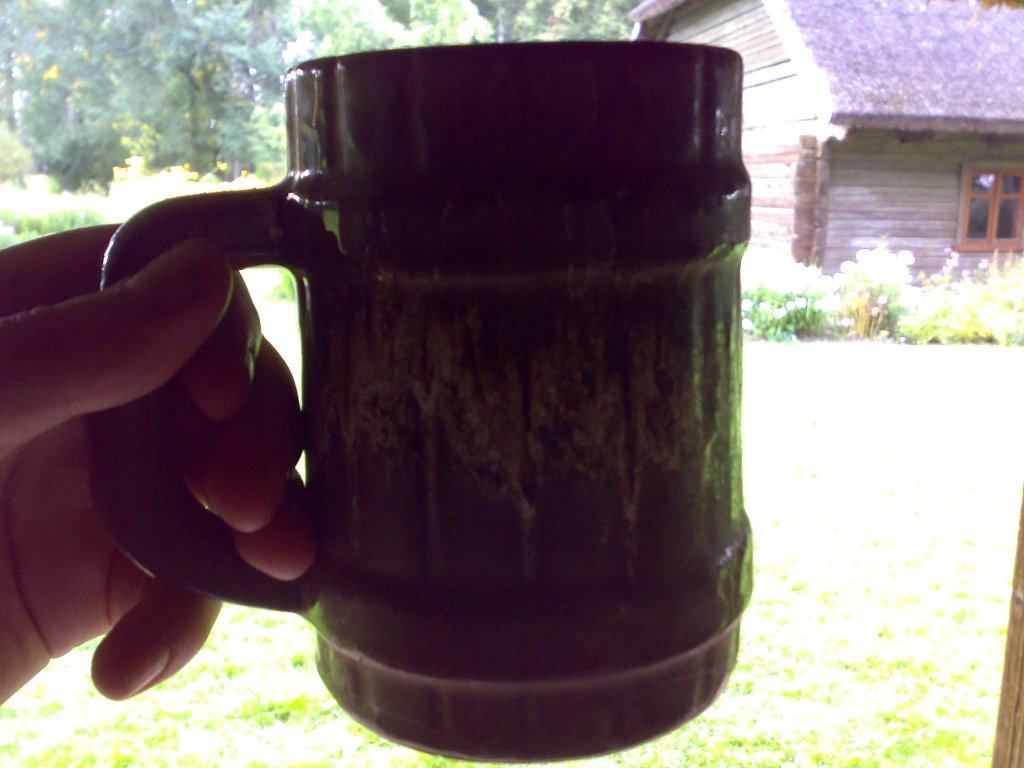
Krūze
