= Proto-Uralic homeland =

Location where the Proto-Uralic language originated

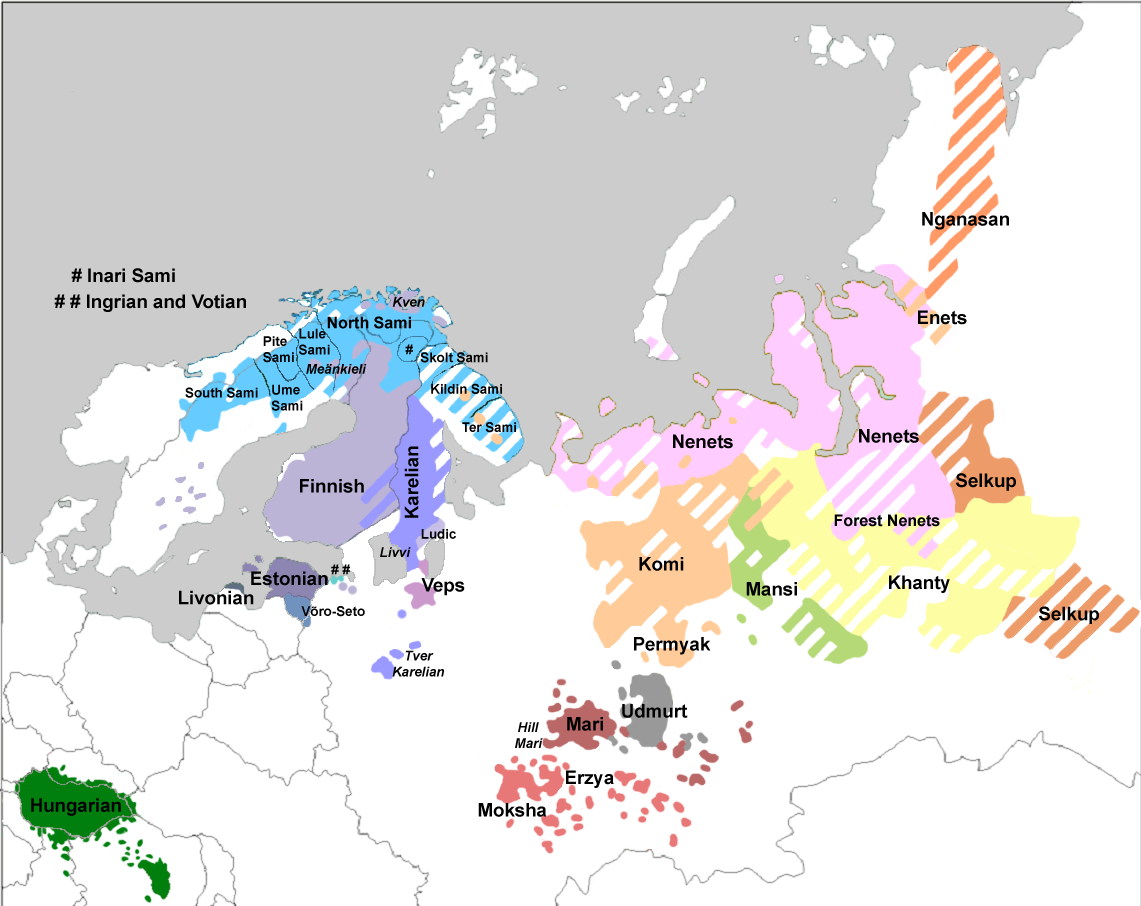
Current distribution of the Uralic languages

The Proto-Uralic homeland is the earliest location in which the Proto-Uralic language was spoken, before its speakers dispersed geographically causing it to diverge into multiple languages. Various locations have been proposed and debated, although as of 2022 "scholarly consensus now gravitates towards a relatively recent provenance of the Uralic languages east of the Ural mountains".

== Homeland hypotheses ==
=== Europe versus Siberia ===
It has been suggested that the Proto-Uralic homeland was located near the Ural Mountains, either on the European or the Siberian side. The main reason to suppose that there was a Siberian homeland has been the traditional taxonomic model that sees the Samoyedic branch as splitting off first. Because the present border between the Samoyedic and the Ugric branch is in Western Siberia, the original split was seen to have occurred there too.

However, a European homeland would be equally possible because the Ugric languages are known to have been spoken earlier on the European side of the Urals. In recent years, it has also been argued based on phonology that the oldest split was not between the Samoyedic and the Finno-Ugric but between the Finno-Permic and the Ugro-Samoyedic language groups. The lexical level is argued to be less reliable, and lexical innovativeness (a small number of shared cognates) can be confused because of the great age of the division. No new arguments for a Siberian homeland have been presented for a long time.

Both European and Siberian homeland proposals have been supported by palaeolinguistic evidence, but only those cases in which the semantic reconstructions are certain and valid. A Siberian homeland has been claimed based on two coniferous tree names in Proto-Uralic, but the trees (Abies sibirica and Pinus sibirica) have for a long time been present also in the far east of Europe. A European homeland is supported by words for 'bee', 'honey', 'elm' etc. They can be reconstructed already to Proto-Uralic, if Samoyedic is no longer seen as the first branch to split off.

More recently, loanword evidence has also been used to support a European homeland. Proto-Uralic has been seen as borrowing words from Proto-Indo-European, and the Proto-Indo-European homeland has rarely been located east of the Urals. Proto-Uralic even seems to have developed in close contact with Proto-Indo-Iranian, which is seen as having arisen in the Poltavka culture of the Caspian steppes before its spread to Asia.

Bryant et al. (2005) equated the Lyalovo culture (ca. 5000–3650 BC) with the Proto-Uralic urheimat, and the following Volosovo culture (ca. 3650–1900 BC) with the Proto-Finno-Ugric urheimat. Two Finnish scholars believe that the culture of Lyalovo was the Proto-Uralic urheimat and that its inhabitants spread Uralic languages to north-eastern Europe. The Volosovo culture has been named the Bronze Age Successor Culture, a textile-ceramic culture that developed in the region between Upper Volga and lakes Ladoga and Onega. It was distinguished from other groups based on the traces of textile used for the production of ceramics, and spread southeast all the way to central Volga, south to the entire river valley of the Oka, southwest to the northern shore of the Daugava, and northwest of Fennoscandia to Karelia, Finland and northern Sweden and Norway. Known as the Seima-Turbino phenomenon, it was a culturally unified, extensive network of trade in copper and bronze. The traces of the Seima-Turbino phenomenon are found in a wide area that begins in Sweden and ends in the Altai Mountains.

However, Jaakko Häkkinen argues that the language of the Volosovo culture was not itself Uralic, but a Paleo-European substratum to Uralic, especially its westernmost branches, and identifies Proto-Uralic with the Garino-Bor culture instead.

The Volosovo region was invaded by the Abashevo cultural groups at about 2300 BC. The latter buried their deceased in kurgans, and they are thought to have spoken a form of Indo-European ancestral to the Indo-Iranian languages and to have influenced the Volosovian vocabulary by introducing Aryan (Indo-Iranian) loan words. The Abashevo contributed to the fact that livestock farming and small-scale farming began to be practiced in the southern parts of the forest zone of Taiga.

It has been hypothesized that Pre-Proto-Uralic was spoken in Asia, on the basis of typological similarity with the Altaic Sprachbund and hypothetical early contacts with the Yukaghir languages. Aikio (2014) agrees with Häkkinen (2012) that Uralic–Yukaghir is unsupported and implausible, and that common vocabulary shared by the two families is best explained as the result of borrowing from Uralic into Yukaghir. However, Aikio (2014) puts the date of borrowing much later, arguing that the loanwords he accepts as valid were borrowed from an early stage of Samoyedic (preceding Proto-Samoyedic; thus roughly in the 1st millennium BC) into Yukaghir, in the same general region between the Yenisei River and Lake Baikal.

=== Continuity theories ===
Archaeological continuity has long been used as the basis of an argument for linguistic continuity. The argument was advanced by Estonians Paul Ariste and Harri Moora in 1956. Just as long, this kind of argumentation has also been heavily criticised. The oldest version of the continuity theory can be called the moderate or shallow continuity theory. It claims that linguistic continuity in Estonia and Finland can be traced back to the arrival of Typical Combed Ware, about 6,000 years ago. This view became mainstream in the multidisciplinary Tvärminne symposium in 1980. At the time, there seemed to be no serious linguistic results to contradict this archaeological view.

The continuity argumentation in the Uralic studies gained greater visibility in the 1990s, when the next step of the continuity theory was popularised (even though this line of reasoning had occasionally received airing). In the radical or deep continuity theory, it is claimed that the linguistic continuity in Finland could be traced back to the Mesolithic initial colonization, beyond 10,000 years.

However, in Indo-European studies, J. P. Mallory had already thoroughly scrutinized the methodological weaknesses of the continuity argumentation in 1989. In Uralic studies, it was also soon noted that the same argument (archaeological continuity) was used to support contradicting views, which revealed the method's unreliability.

At the same time, new linguistic results appeared to contradict the continuity theories: the datings of Proto-Saami and Proto-Finnic and of Proto-Uralic (Kallio 2006; Häkkinen 2009) are both clearly younger than it was thought in the framework of the continuity theories.

Nowadays linguists rarely believe in the continuity theories because of their shown methodological flaws and their incompatibility with the new linguistic results, but some archaeologists and laymen may still advance such arguments.

== Modern view ==
In the 21st century, linguistic arguments have placed the Proto-Uralic homeland possibly around the Kama River or, more generally, close to the Great Volga Bend and the Ural Mountains, although Petri Kallio, while agreeing with the placement of the homeland in Central Russia, prefers the Volga-Oka region further to the west. The expansion of Proto-Uralic has been dated to about 2000 BC (4000 years ago), and its earlier stages go back at least one or two millennia earlier. Either way, this is considerably later than the earlier views of the continuity theories, which would place Proto-Uralic deep into Europe. Asko Parpola associates the early Proto-Uralic language with the Neolithic Elshanka and Kama cultures, placing the ultimate homeland of Uralic languages to the Kama River valley. Proto-Uralic would later expand with the Seima-Turbino material culture. According to him, Uralic languages were transmitted by language shift from groups of hunters and fishers participating in the spread of the Seima-Turbino culture towards Siberia.

An alternative view has been presented by Juha Janhunen (2009), who argues for a homeland in southern or central Siberia, somewhere between the Ob and Yenisei river or near the Sayan mountains in the Russian–Mongolian border region.

This view has been corroborated by a number of scholars, including by a team around Grünthal et al. 2022. They presented evidence that the Proto-Uralic homeland was located east of the Urals, likely somewhere in Siberia, and spoken by local hunter-gatherer communities. The Finno-Ugric branch spread along rivers north- and westwards into the Volga region, while the Samoyedic branch headed north- and eastwards. The spread of Uralic languages may be in part due to the Seima-Turbino phenomenon, although no direct link between them can be made yet. The material culture technology of proto-Uralic-speakers can be described as "Neolithic", as it included pottery but no vocabulary for food production. They further concluded that Proto-Uralic must have stood out of contact with Proto-Indo-European and did not share any genealogical ancestry with Indo-European, arguing that "whether based on cognacy or loans the argument from lexical resemblances is flawed", invalidating previous arguments for a homeland in the Volga region. Last, they noted that a number of traits of Uralic are "distinctive in western Eurasia. A number of typological properties are eastern-looking overall, fitting comfortably into northeast Asia, Siberia, or the North Pacific Rim", and are rare or absent in Europe, and that the Uralic languages "must have expanded via language shift", while "the shifting population had minimal impact on Proto-Uralic grammar and vocabulary."

Rasmus G. Bjørn (2022), citing the previous findings, such as Grünthal et al. 2022, argues that the Proto-Uralic speakers likely resided in Southern Siberia, and may have been part of the local Okunev culture in the Altai region, following the proposals of Janhunen and Peyrot. He notes that contact between Uralic and the Indo-European branches of Tocharian and Indo-Iranian at the one hand, and between Uralic and Turkic at the other hand, support a homeland near the Altai Mountains. An association with the Seima-Turbino phenomenon and the dispersal of Uralic languages "fits the string-like distribution of the western Uralic languages as well as close contacts with the Andronovo (and preceding Sintashta) culture associated with speakers of Indo-Iranian. Proto-Samoyedic was then either left in or migrated to the area around the Minusinsk Basin". Bjørn attributes the "eastern lexical elements" to contact with Turkic, which radiated out from the Amur region and can be associated with Northeast Asian linguistic area.

Jaakko Häkkinen (2023) argues that the location of Early Proto-Uralic and more distant stages are temporally irrelevant for the location of the Late Proto-Uralic homeland. He further elaborates that the "very distant Pre-Proto-Uralic" may have been spoken far from the region where Late Proto-Uralic was spoken. Häkkinen argues that Late Proto-Uralic and the successive stages of disintegration happened in the Central Ural Region, based on certain tree names and Indo-Iranian loanword layers. According to him, the disintegration of the proto-language began soon after 2500 BCE, but the speech community remained in a narrow region for a long time, until the second millennium BCE, after which the actual Uralic expansion began. On this basis the early phase of the Seima-Turbino Network in Southwestern Siberia could not yet be associated to the Uralic languages, but perhaps the later stages in Europe could. In any case, according to him, the arrival of the Uralic language in the Central Ural Region would precede even the early stage of the Seima-Turbino network.

== Evidence from population genetics ==
Some scholars have attempted to use genetic evidence to locate the original Proto-Uralic speaker population, a source of contention.

Vladimir Napolskikh, who studied the origins of the "earth-diver" creation myths, has concluded that a certain variety of those myths, which is found in the folklore of Uralic-speaking peoples and other N1, C3, and Q (Y-DNA) carrying populations, originated in Siberia.

Genetic data suggests that early Uralic-speakers may be associated with hunter-gatherers in Western and Southern Siberia. These specific Uralic-speaking hunter-gatherers are argued to have formed from an admixture event between Western and Eastern Eurasian sources, with the calculated date of admixture is inferred to be ~7–9 kya. The Western source can be attributed to local Ancient North Eurasians, while the Eastern sources can be linked to "Neo-Siberians" (Eastern Siberian hunter-gatherers).

A number of population genomic studies in 2018 and 2019 note that the spread of Uralic languages may be associated with observed "Siberian" gene flow (represented by Nganasans) into the Eastern Baltic region. The proto-Uralic languages may be associated with early "Neo-Siberian" expansions outgoing from Northeast Asia westwards (~6-11kya), which largely replaced previous "Paleosiberian groups", but predated the expansion of Turkic languages.

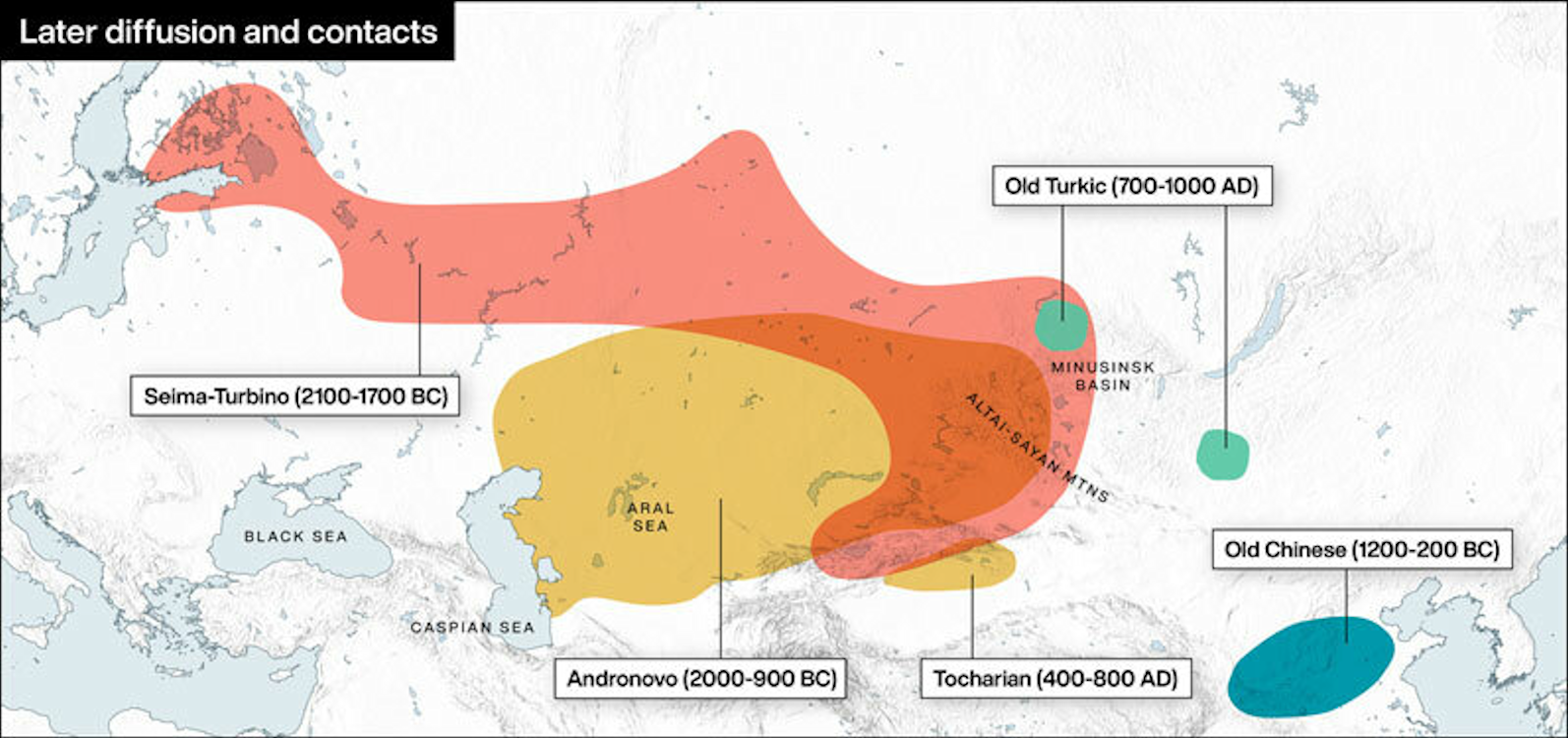
Cultural diffusion and contacts in Central Asia.

Rasmus G. Bjørn (2022) argues for a link between the Proto-Uralic-speakers and the pre-Indo-European Okunevo culture, as well as to the Tarim EMBA cluster. He argues that following the expansion of Indo-Europeans eastwards and Northeast Asian (putative Turkic) groups westwards meeting in the Altai region, the early Uralic-speaking groups dispersed along the Seima-Turbino route. He also notes a correspondence between this expansion route and the frequency of haplogroup N.

Peltola et al. 2023 reproduced the findings that modern Uralic-speaking populations display varying degrees of ancestry from a "Siberian" source maximized in modern day Nganasan people. Nganasans and a historical specimen from Bronze Age Southern Siberia (Krasnoyarsk_Krai_BA; kra001) were found to display the lowest f4 estimate for the eastern ancestry among Uralic-speaking populations, and represent a plausible source. In contrast, affinity for Ancient North Eurasian-rich ancestry (represented by Eastern Hunter-Gatherers) was not significant and only observed among Western Finno-Ugric speakers.

According to a 2025 study, ancestry from the Yakutia Late Neolithic–Bronze Age is associated with the migrations of prehistoric Uralic speakers, coinciding with the collapse of pre-Bronze Age population structure. This ancestry was formed through a 50:50 mixture between the Syalakh-Belkachi population of the Lena Valley, who had Ancient Paleo-Siberian affinities, and Transbaikal Kitoi population, who had Inland East Asian affinities. Contemporary males associated with this ancestry also carried subclades of haplogroup N, which is predominant for present Uralic-speaking groups. However, the study does not claim that Proto-Uralic itself was spoken in Yakutia, even though a part of ancestors for the later Uralic speakers have arrived from there.

== See also ==
- Proto-Uralic language
- Uralic languages
- Finno-Ugric languages
- Samoyedic languages
