= Neman culture =

Archaeological culture in the Baltic region

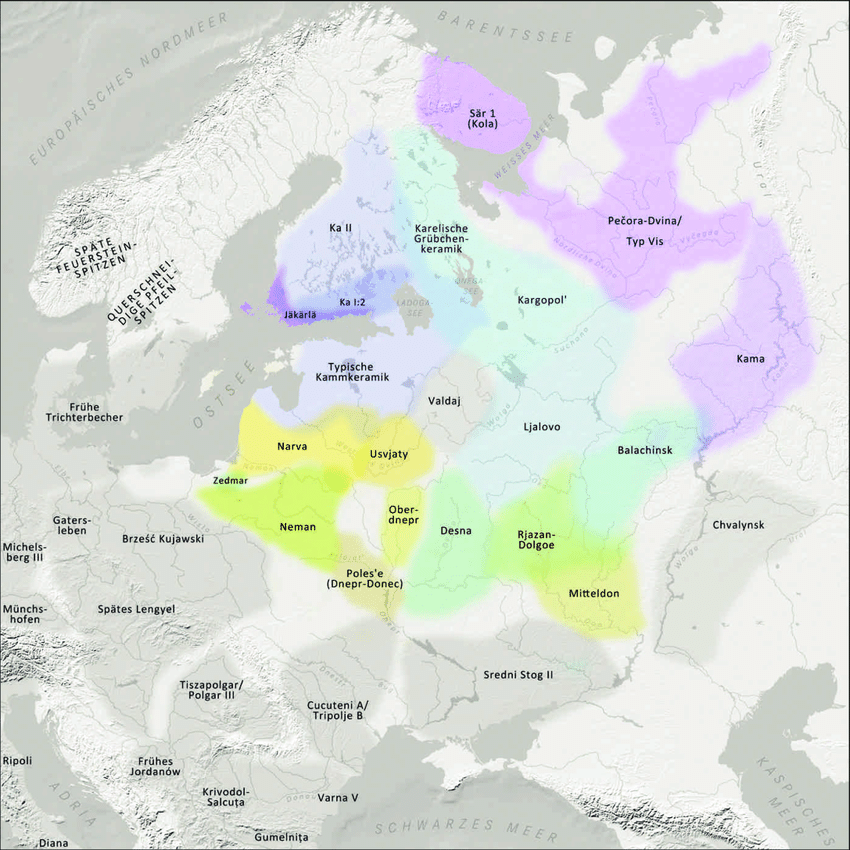
- Geographical range: Europe
- Period: Mesolithic, Para-Neolithic
- Dates: c. 5100 BC – c. 2000 BC
- Preceded by: Janisławice culture, Oder Final Mesolithic, Narva culture, Kunda culture, Zedmar culture
- Followed by: Funnelbeaker culture, Globular Amphora culture, Corded Ware culture, Rzucewo culture, Mierzanowice culture, Trzciniec culture

The archaeological Neman culture (German: Memel-Kultur) existed from about 5100 to the 3rd millennium BC, starting in the Mesolithic and continued into the middle Neolithic. It was located in the upper basin of the Neman River (present-day northern Poland, southern Lithuania, western Belarus and Kaliningrad Oblast). In the north, the Neman culture bordered the Kunda culture during the Mesolithic and the Narva culture during the Neolithic.

== Mesolithic ==
During the Atlantic period, the climate warmed and broad-leaved tree forests covered much of the territory. The migrating reindeer, mainstay of the Paleolithic hunters, retreated to the North and were followed by forest animals. The people adapted to the changed environment. They were still nomadic, but traveled shorter distances and stayed in the same place for longer periods. The archaeologists found small camps used just once and larger camps to which hunters returned repeatedly. These camps were usually located near lakes or rivers. The people used to hunt with arrows and spears and fish with harpoons. The flint tools of Mesolithic Neman culture were influenced both by microliths from southeastern Europe and macroliths from northern Europe (Maglemosian culture). Therefore, the culture was initially called Microlithic–Macrolithic culture to avoid confusion with the already established Neolithic Neman culture. Despite variety of influences, the culture was rather stable for 2500–3000 years indicating no significant migrations. Therefore, the artifacts are rather unvaried stock of arrowheads, trapezoid blades, oval axes.

== Neolithic ==
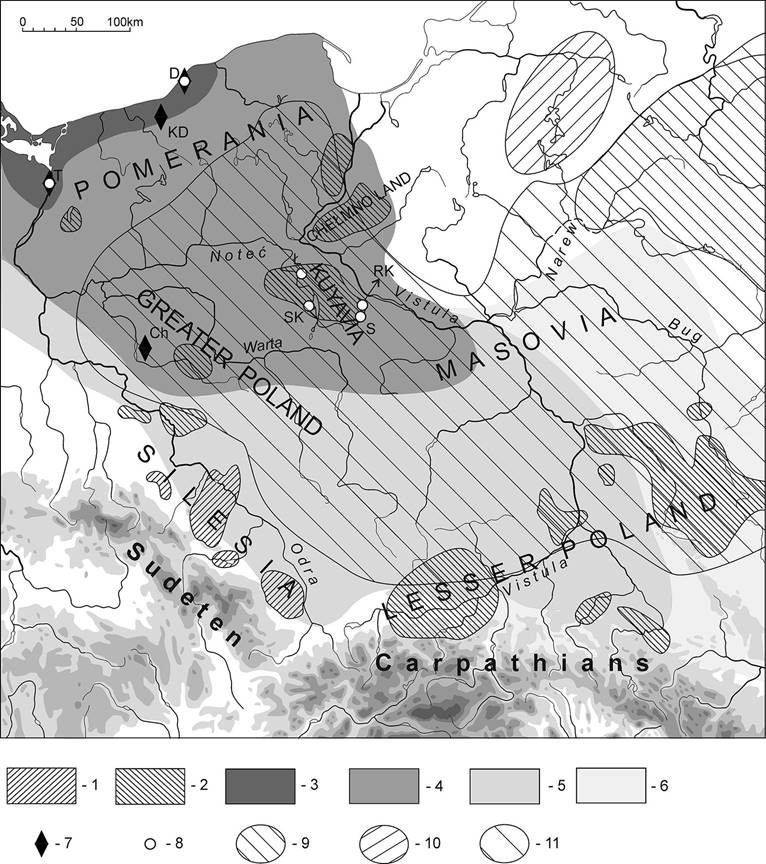
Range of Neman culture in late 5th millennium BC (9) and in 4th and 3rd millennia BC (11).

The Neolithic began with the appearance of pottery in mid 5th millennium BC. The Semi-Neolithic Neman culture was a successor of the Mesolithic Neman culture. Most of flint tools are very similar between both cultures. A new widespread development was knives with sharpened and flared point. Pottery of the Neman culture had pointed bottoms and was made of clay mixed with organic matter or crushed quartzite. Some latter examples have flat bottoms. The vessels were a bit narrower and curvier than of the Narva culture. They were decorated with a thin layer of white clay and rows of small imprints around the rim. The rest of the vessel had diagonal stripes forming a pattern of a fishnet or more rows of small imprints. Some pottery found in settlements of the Neman culture was made by Narva culture. Such phenomenon is explained by trade of flint, which Narva culture in the north did not have. Towards the end of the Neman culture, the pottery became more varied and exhibits influence of the Rzucewo culture: imprints made by a cord or resembling a fir. Eventually, the culture was overtaken by the Globular Amphora culture and the Corded Ware culture.

== Gallery ==
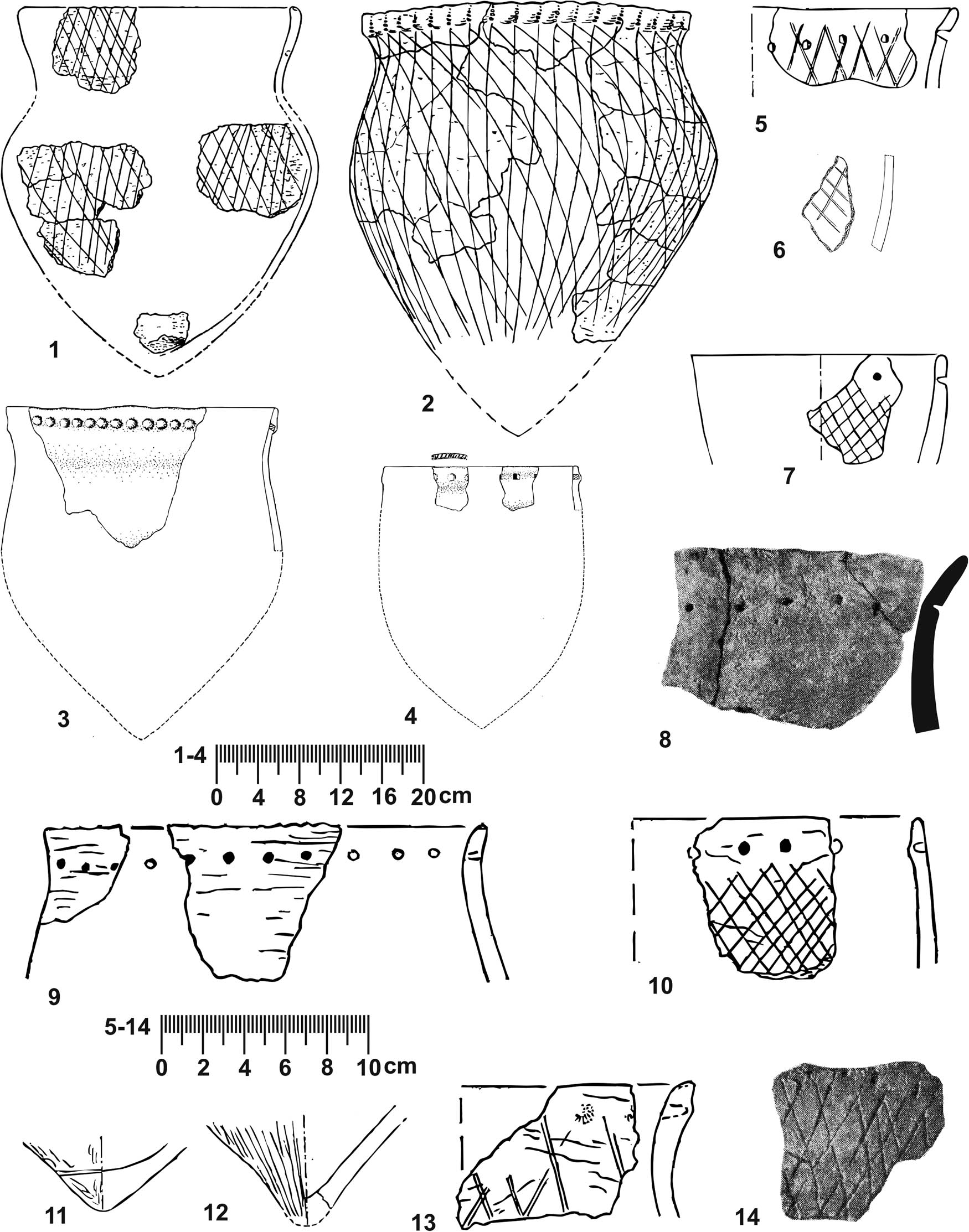
Pottery of the Neman culture.

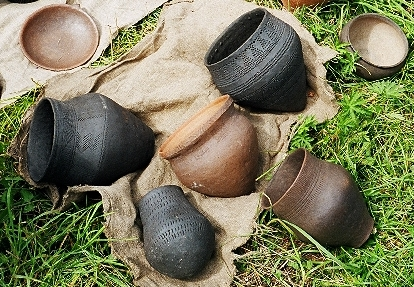
Reconstructed Neman type pottery.

== Citations ==
=== Cited sources ===
- Girininkas, Algirdas (2005). "Neolitas". Lietuvos istorija. Akmens amžius ir ankstyvasis metalų laikotarpis (in Lithuanian). Vol. I. Baltos lankos. ISBN 9955-584-90-4.
- Juodagalvis, Vygandas (2000). "Neolithic Period". Prehistoric Lithuania. Archaeology Exhibition Guide. National Museum of Lithuania. ISBN 9955-415-07-X.
- Juodagalvis, Vygandas (2005). "Mezolitas". Lietuvos istorija. Akmens amžius ir ankstyvasis metalų laikotarpis (in Lithuanian). Vol. I. Baltos lankos. ISBN 9955-584-90-4.
- Zinkevičius, Zigmas; Luchtanas, Aleksiejus; Česnys, Gintautas (2007). "Papildymai. Nemuno kultūra". Tautos kilmė (in Lithuanian). Mokslo ir enciklopedijų leidybos institutas. Archived from the original on 2011-07-22.
