= Kama culture =

Archaeological culture in Russia

- Geographical range: Urals
- Period: Subneolithic
- Dates: c. 5500 BC – c. 4000 BC
- Followed by: Comb Ceramic culture

The Kama culture (also known as Volga-Kama or Khutorskoye from finds near the Khutorskoye settlement) is an Eastern European Subneolithic archaeological culture from the 6th-4th millennium BC. The area covers the Kama, Vyatka and the Ik-Belaya watershed (Perm and Kirov regions, Udmurtia, Tatarstan and Bashkortostan).

== Classification ==
The definition of the Kama culture remains a subject of debate.

Initially, it was determined by O.H. Bader on the territory of the Middle Kama, where he distinguished two phases: Borovoye (Borovoy Lake I) and Khutorskoye. A.Kh. Khalikov united the finds with Pitted and Combed Ware of the Lower and Middle Kama into one Volga-Kama culture. I.V. Kalinina, based on the study of ceramics came to the conclusion that there are two distinct cultures: Volga-Kama pitted pottery and Kama combed pottery.

A.A. Vibornov identified three stages of development in the Kama culture, and V.P. Denisov and L.A. Nagovitchin joined the Kama Neolithic finds with combed ceramics into a single Khutorskoye culture, synchronous with the Poluden culture in the Ural Mountains. Its comb decorated pottery is similar to that of the Upper Volga culture.

The Kama culture is also culturally close and genetically related to the Volosovo culture. There are scholars who also believe that the culture is related to the Dnieper-Donetsk.

== Settlements ==
The rectangular partially sunken dwellings, ranging in size from 6×8 to 16×5m, are grouped in unfortified permanent and temporary settlements, located on the banks of lakes, floodplains and on river terraces.

== Tools and ceramics ==
The pottery is thick-walled, egg-shaped, both round- and pointed-bottomed. The stone and bone inventory of the pottery culture demonstrated a Mesolithic character. It is heavily ornamented with comb stamp designs, vertical and horizontal zigzags, sloping rows, braids, triangles, banded comb meshes. Kama culture is noted for its metal work and handicrafts. The instruments for work include scrapers, sharpeners, knives, leaf-shaped and semi-rhombic arrowheads, chisels and adzes, weights.

== Way of life ==
There are no signs of agriculture. The economy was based on hunting and fishing. Burials are unknown.

== Origin and periodization ==
In its development the Kama culture passed through three stages: early (sites: Mokino, Ust-Bukorok, Ziarat, Ust-Shizhma), middle (sites: Khutorskaya Kryazhskaya, Lebedynska) and late (sites: Lyovshino, Chernashka). The culture was formed in the early Neolithic on a local Mesolithic substrate under the influence of southern steppe populations. The prehistoric phase according to archaeologists emerged around 2,000 BC. During this stage, the culture existed in the area that began in the Ufa River (in modern Bashkortostan) through the entire Kama drainage area to the upper Pechora River (Komimu). In the southern regions the influence of the nearby forest-steppe cultures of the Middle Volga can be observed during the whole period of existence.

In the developed Neolithic a population of Trans-Ural origin penetrates in the upper and middle Kama. In this period there are formed local variants: Verkhnekamsk, Ikska-Belsky and Nizhnekamsk. At the end of the Neolithic the lower Kama falls under the influence of the Early Eneolithic Samara culture.

== Linguistic affiliation ==
Linguist Asko Parpola (2022) associates the Kama culture and the Elshanka culture with an expansion of PIE speakers into an area spoken by the early Proto-Uralic language, which would later expand eastwards and westwards with the Seima-Turbino material culture. Uralic languages would later be transmitted by language shift from groups of hunters and fishers participating in the spread of the Seima-Turbino culture towards Siberia and back to Northeastern Europe.
