= Bug–Dniester culture =

Archaeological culture

Bug-Dniester culture
- Period: Neolithic
- Dates: c. 6300 BC – 5000 BC
- Preceded by: Elshanka culture, Körös culture
- Followed by: Dnieper–Donets culture

Map of European Neolithic cultures; the Bug–Dniester culture is represented by the yellow shaded area on the right side of the map.

The Bug–Dniester culture was an archaeological culture that developed in and around the Central Black Earth Region of Moldavia and Ukraine, around the Dniester and Southern Bug rivers, during the Neolithic era. The late Bug-Dniester culture is considered a variant of the Linear Pottery Culture.

Over the course of approximately 1,300 years (from the years 6300–5000 BC), the Bug–Dniester culture went through different cultural phases; during this period of time the population remained about the same. The Neolithic phase in this region developed out of the local Mesolithic, through contact with the Chalcolithic cultures in the west and Neolithic hunter-gatherer cultures in the East (adhering to Soviet terminology, Neolithic is defined here as pottery-bearing, not agricultural).

The people in this region relied predominantly on hunting aurochs, red deer, roe deer, and boar, and fishing for rutilus, eel, and pike. They made pottery from approximately 6200 BC of a sort derived from the Elshanka culture of the middle Volga. Much of this pottery had pointed bottoms, designed for cooking over a fire; they were often decorated in patterns of wavy lines.

This local culture was influenced by the neighboring Neolithic Körös culture, whose origins lay in the Carpathian basin. The Körös farmers had arrived in the upper valleys of the Seret and Prut in around 5800–5700 BC. Körös pottery forms were copied by the Bug–Dniester people. Wild grasses were abandoned in favor of einkorn, emmer, and spelt, and cattle-breeding was adopted. Some of the earliest known evidence for domesticated plants and animals during the Neolithic are the porcine and cattle bones and barley and emmer found in the Ponto-Caspian Steppe at Bug–Dniester sites.

== See also ==
- Dnieper–Donets culture
- Linear Pottery culture
