= Elshanka culture =

Mesolithic and Early Neolithic culture

- Geographical range: Middle Volga
- Period: Subneolithic
- Dates: 7th millennium BCE
- Preceded by: Zarzian culture?
- Followed by: Samara culture

The Elshanka culture (Russian: Елшанская культура, sometimes erroneously Anglicized as Elshan culture) was a Subneolithic or very early Neolithic culture that flourished in the middle Volga region in the 7th millennium BC. The sites are mostly individual graves scattered along the Samara and Sok rivers. They revealed Europe's oldest pottery.

The culture extended along the Volga from Ulyanovsk Oblast in the north through the Samara Bend towards Khvalynsk Hills and the Buzuluk District in the south. No signs of permanent dwellings have been found. Elshanka people appear to have been hunters and fishermen who had seasonal settlements at the confluences of rivers. Most grave goods come from such settlements.

Elshanka is believed to be the source from which the art of pottery spread south and westward towards the Balkans (with one particularly important site being the Surskoy Island in the Dnieper Rapids where pottery was made from 6200 BC to 5800 BC). Elshanka pots, dated from 6700 BC onwards, usually have simple ornaments, though some have none. They were made "of a clay-rich mud collected from the bottoms of stagnant ponds, formed by the coiling method and were baked in open fires at 450-600 degrees Celsius".

A man buried at Lebyazhinka IV (a site usually assigned to the Elshanka culture) had the Haplogroup R1b. I. Vasiliev and A. Vybornov, citing the similarity of pottery, assert that Elshanka people were the descendants of the Zarzian culture who had been ousted from Central Asia by progressive desertification. Other researchers see Elshanka ceramic industry as a local attempt at reproducing Zarzian pots.

A rapid cooling around 6200 BC and influences from the Lower Volga region led the Elshanka culture to be succeeded by the Middle Volga culture (with more complex ceramic ornaments) which lasted until the 5th millennium BC. It was succeeded in the region by the better known Samara culture.

Linguist Asko Parpola (2022) associates the Elshanka culture with the Pre-Proto-Indo-European language, stating that Elshanka expanded northwards into the forest zone as the Kama culture, reflecting a migration of Pre-PIE speakers into the Pre-Proto-Uralic-speaking area and thus possibly explaining the Indo-Uralic linguistic parallels.
