= Rzucewo culture =

Local archaeological culture

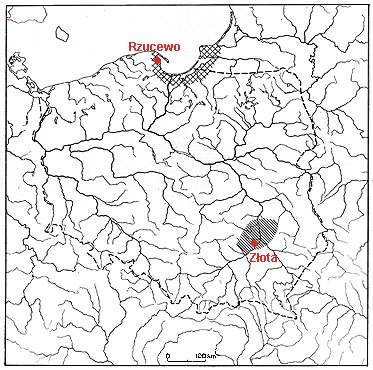
Confirmed extent of Rzucewo culture in northern Poland and Kaliningrad Oblast

The Rzucewo (also Rutzau or Bay Coast culture, from German: Haffküstenkultur, 2700 BC) was a local archaeological culture of late Neolithic. It centered at the coast of the Bay of Gdansk and Vistula Lagoon and extended north to the Curonian Lagoon and up to Šventoji settlement in Lithuania. It is either named after the adjacent bays or after an archaeological site in the village of Rzucewo near Puck.

The Rzucewo culture was a hybrid of Corded Ware culture and pre-Indo-European Narva and Globular Amphora cultures. Traditionally, Rzucewo was identified as a variation of Corded Ware culture; however, the newest research suggests that the culture formed before Corded Ware. This culture specialized in exploitation of marine resources and existed in parallel to its mother culture for some time. Rzucewo settlements, consisting of characteristic houses reinforced against sea erosion, were located along the coast and further east. The Rzucewo people had domesticated cattle, pigs, some goats, but did little cultivation and engaged in fishery and hunting, especially of seals, then numerous along the Baltic coast. The Rzucewo culture people produced and widely traded amber decorative items in specialist shops. A large number of amber artifacts was found in Juodkrantė.

Formerly, this culture was interpreted as the earliest detection of the Balts. Tracing formation of the Balts to Rzucewo culture could explain differences between Western and Eastern Balts and their languages (and possibly a stage of West Baltic–Pre-Slavic unity; see Balto-Slavic languages), though linguistic conclusions based on this methodology are controversial and tentative at best, ad hoc at worst. Typically, Polish and German archaeologists place the culture just on the coast, while Lithuanian and Latvian scientists extend it much further inland describing coastal settlements as a cultural and economic center and inland villages as a periphery.

== See also ==
- Pitted Ware culture
- Comb Ceramic culture
- Single Grave culture
- Battle Axe culture
- Fatyanovo–Balanovo culture
- Middle Dnieper culture
- Zvejnieki burial ground
