= Subneolithic =

Archaeological period

- Alternative names: Para-Neolithic, Ceramic Mesolithic, Pottery-Mesolithic, Late Mesolithic, Forest Neolithic
- Geographical range: Scandinavia, north and north-eastern Europe
- Period: 5000/4000–3200/2700 BCE
- Characteristics: Hunter-gatherer economy, pottery
- Preceded by: Mesolithic
- Followed by: Neolithic

The Subneolithic is an archaeological period sometimes used to distinguish cultures that are transitional between the Mesolithic and the Neolithic. Subneolithic societies typically adopted some secondary elements of the Neolithic package (such as pottery), but retained economies based on hunting and gathering and fishing instead of agriculture. For the most part they were sedentary. The Subneolithic dates to the period 5000/4000–3200/2700 BCE in Scandinavia, north and north-eastern Europe.

== Notable sites ==
The Subneolithic is observed across Scandinavia, north, and north-eastern Europe in the period 5000/4000–3200/2700 BCE, including at sites in Lithuania, Finland, Poland, and Russia. Notable Subneolithic sites include:

- Szczepanki (Poland, 4500–2000 BCE) – associated with the Zedmar culture and notable for finds of wood, fishing structures and pottery.
- Šventoji (Lithuania, 3500–2700 BCE) – notable for finds of bone points and harpoon heads, as well as contributing to the reconstruction of Subneolithic diets.
- Iijoki River (Finland, 3500–2900 BCE) – one of the most abundant sources of Stone Age pit houses, with over 300 houses and other pit structures.
- Väikallio, Astuvansalmi and Saraakallio (Finland, 5100–3300 BCE) – notable for rock art.
- Kuorikkikangas (Finland, 2900–2300 BCE) – includes finds of pottery and a pit house.

== Housing and migration ==
=== Sedentism ===
Subneolithic groups were largely sedentary, holding permanent residency within favourable environmental conditions. The progression of residential mobility towards sedentism is evident in the groups of coastal Ostrobothnia. By the mid-Subneolithic, these groups developed sedentary lifestyles perhaps due to conditions in which there existed restricted access to important resources or the need for frequent collective labour for effective resource exploitation, and as well because coastal Ostrobothnia provided conditions for abundant estuary fishing.

=== Pit-houses ===
Pit-houses served as the primary shelters for Subneolithic groups and indicate the growth of social cohesion and community within these cultures. The discovery of a Subneolithic pit house at the Kuorikkikangas site was the first excavation to demonstrate the existence of rectangular pit-houses where priorly Finnish Stone Age pit-houses were considered characteristically circular. The pit-house had an estimated internal size of 5 by 6.5 metres, two entrances and two fireplaces (suggesting that two households occupied the space and was divided between men and women, as opposed to individual households), and was dated to the late Subneolithic (2600–2300 BCE) – aligning with the Pöljä style pottery within Finland. The pit-house was utilised for the winter, as suggested by the exclusive distribution of burnt bones within the pit house and as well, the lack of migratory bird findings within said fragments. The lack of significant activity areas external to the house indicates the shelter was utilised only briefly. The condition of the waste within the dwelling suggests the inhabitants held pragmatic habits, differentiating between neither the disposal of large nor small waste. Furthermore, hearths and surrounding areas were devoid of findings, indicating a workspace kept clear of waste.

== Agriculture ==
Subneolithic groups retained Mesolithic subsistence strategies, including hunting and gathering and fishing. This distinguished them from their Neolithic neighbours, who adopted agriculture. Keeping domesticated animals was not a defining practice of the Subneolithic, as it was for the Neolithic, but there has been evidence which suggest that some cultures incorporated this custom. Findings of domesticated animal bones and even grain at Subneolithic sites suggests interactions between Neolithic and Subneolithic cultures.

=== Fishing ===
For coastal Subneolithic groups, fishing held significance not only for sustenance but as well in culture (evident through its representation in folk art). Fishing structures demonstrate elevated levels of quality and quantity, especially in considering the effort of acquiring required wood. Given the implied labour and time cost of fishing practices, groups would have been highly reliant on aquatic resources for subsistence – balancing the effort of the subsistence strategy and its contribution to the diet.

==== Fishing methods ====
Analyses of wooden artefacts reveal that three methods of both active and passive fishing were implemented, at least at the Iijoki River.

===== Passive fishing =====
1. Lath screen panels were implemented in weir fishing, either with a fence and possibly with traps. Lath screen weirs and fishing fences would direct fish to primary traps, nets and/or lath screen traps, directing their movement through their placement in narrow channels.
2. Net fishing with nets implemented either independently or in conjunction with laths as an attachment onto screen fences.
3. Spear fishing

===== Active fishing =====
Active fishing methods involved the use of leisters and spears. Eels were caught through use of leisters, which had relatively broad wooden side prongs specifically designed for the purpose. These branched eel leisters were present in Finland and Šventoji. Barbs were attached by birch bark, pitch, rawhide strips, sinew, birch bark bindings and plant fibre.

==== Fishing gear ====
Subneolithic groups utilised several forms of fishing technology, including traps, lath screen panels and weirs. The gear appeared catered towards specific fish species and within specific habitual conditions – planted in river estuaries, inlets, coves and shallow lake bottoms. The greater significance of woodland exploitation within the Subneolithic period, given the escalation of sedentary occupation, population growth, and establishment of secondary dwellings, accounted for the use of wood within fishing technology such as gangboards, fish cages and paddles in Poland. Archaeological analysis of such technologies within the Subneolithic Zedmar culture of north-eastern Poland reveal insights into the agricultural and technological behaviours of these groups.

===== Gangboards =====
Scaffolding gangboards to lakes were built and made of materials including tree poles and trunks, boulders, and rows of stones. These structures were installed across the shore, and also appeared floating whilst fixed to lake bottoms.

===== Fish cages =====
Wooden slats were implemented in the creation of cages intended for keeping fish alive. The creation of such devices demonstrate significant woodworking skill through the manner with which the wooden slats appeared standardised and the method of having been longitudinally stripped from a tree trunk. Slats were bound together using binding, the notches in slats indicating their presence. The size of slats, location and steepness of the Szczepanki archaeological site indicate the planks were implemented as creels for keeping live fish. Made of pine wood, the slats (though more difficult to harvest) offered greater protection against damage by otters due to its resinous taste.

===== Paddles =====
Dated to 4200 BCE, a long leaf-shaped paddle at the Szczepanki site (made of Fraxinus wood) appeared akin to modern paddles due to its hydrodynamical curve – achieved through bending rather than cutting or carving. The artefact also featured a decorative handle, painted with tar and likely also red ochre.

===== Laths =====
In western Russia and the Baltic Sea region, laths screens were a common archaeological occurrence in wetland environments. Material collection, sledge transportation and utensil production were occasions for the winter seasons. The optimal material was pine trees and as well, bast, wicker and birch bark (utilised for entire sheets of fishing structures as well as strip bindings). Traditionally, laths were produced in conjunction with splints and before production, pine trunks were dried and occasionally heated (by the oven) within the house. To obtain long, flexible laths, the trunks were split parallel through the use of a knife or wooden splitting stick. Various wood types comprised the piles which supported lath screens, likely what was locally available and befit for the waterlogged conditions. Lime bast appeared commonly as the binding for trap panels however, this may be considered a Finnish adaptation to the fishing tradition given the presence of other wood types in other geographical contexts – such as the use of bulrush (Scirpus) in Russia's Upper Volga region.

Laths were planted via a hole in the ice or through wading in the water. Lath screen panels were planted in shallow water during late winter from boats. Abundant catches were obtained by the earlier setting of laths. However, ice could pose a risk – damaging or breaking the structures. For this reason, they were also set by boat and raft later in spring. Harsher conditions demanded the dismantling of laths earlier in the season (before winter) where in calmer water, trap fishing was feasible through winter. Calm waters could house traps for years without requiring their dismantlement, with only broken elements mended or replaced.

== Diet ==
Subneolithic diets consisted of aquatic and terrestrial animals. Diets may have been distinct between groups of both similar and disparate geographical positioning.

Inhabitants of the southeast Baltic coast at Šventoji and Benaičiai consumed a majority of freshwater fish, followed by seal and terrestrial animals. Stable isotopic analysis (a scientific process enabling scientists to reveal information about the individual's participation in the food web) of human bones, findings of fishing equipment (fish weirs and nets), and comparisons of the quantities of bones for each species support this understanding of the group's diet. Refuse layers at Subneolithic archaeological sites reveal the presence of freshwater fish species, predominantly pike but also rudd, bream, perch, zander, and wels catfish. Marine species present were flounder and four cod. Mammal bones included a majority of seal and as well, boar, beaver and elk. Fragmental remains are dominated by seal but this is a consequence of their more frequent identification in archaeological contexts due to the nature of fish bones which appear small and fragmented. Furthermore, all elements of the fish were often employed and thus contributes to their smaller archaeological record.

Archaeological findings of the Subneolithic group, the Zedmar culture, reveal the consumption of aurochs, wisent, horse, brown bear, wild cats, badger, otter, various small mustelids, hare, hedgehog, forest birds, raptors, big waders, divers, pikeperch, ruffe, eel, and rapfen. These findings further indicate that during this period there occurred a greater exploitation of diversified habitats, accounting for the inflation in the diversity of diets.

=== Food storage ===
The existence of the storage economies of Subneolithic groups are evidenced in archaeological fish remains. Incorporated at least in the northern latitudes as an over-wintering strategy, settlement sites integrated pits in house floors, above ground warehouses with post holes, and small pit features on the site's fray which contributed towards these storage techniques. Dried fish would have been beneficial for added sustenance over the winter months and are evidenced through the presence of salmon remains which otherwise lack head bones and pectoral girdle parts but retain vertebrae and ribs – suggesting the storage of meat-bearing fish portions. Sun and air drying, smoking and fermenting may have been successful methods of preservation, given the climactic conditions of the period.

== Technology ==
=== Weaponry ===
Harpoons and points were significant weaponry employed within Stone Age cultures. Discovered Subneolithic weapons have been composed of osseous raw materials sourced from elk, mammal and ungulate. The creation of points involved whittling, scraping, grinding, polishing, splitting, fracturing and the ‘groove and splinter’ technique. Harpoon heads demonstrate evidence of scraping, cutting, grinding, smoothing, polishing, sawing, and occasionally whittling. Drilling has also been implemented in some instances, such as in decorating the harpoon with the ornamental pattern of circles. Scraping, whittling, and grinding were methods of surface processing implemented to provide needed shape, typically only to the respective areas rather than the object's entirety. These processes were performed using a variety of tools, these being flint, metal and stone implements.

Harpoon heads and points are typically regarded as hunting instruments, and it is therefore consistent that they may have been utilised for seasonal seal, elk or boar hunting in alignment with the group's diet. Further evidence also suggests that points had potential usages as projectiles, for sewing or piercing, and in activities of a rotational nature (such as drilling). Harpoon heads are often related to hunting, but some findings have demonstrated their reworking and usages as grinders.

=== Pottery ===
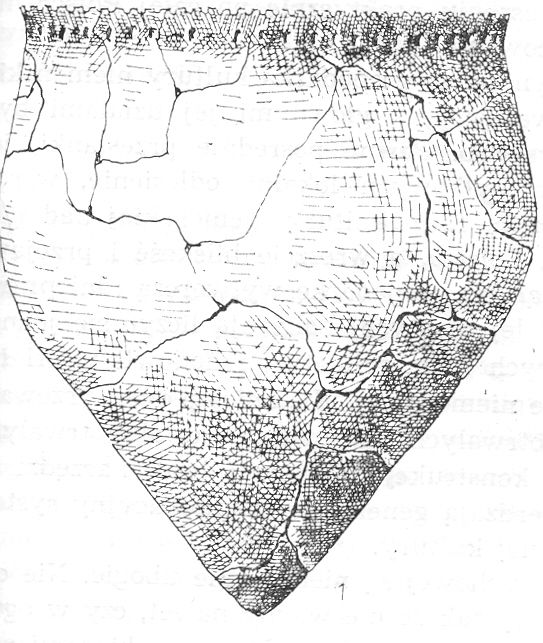
A depiction of vessels belonging to the Narva culture

Pottery, as a defining feature of the Subneolithic, distinguishes these cultures from the Mesolithic through the adoption of this Neolithic element and accounts for the alternate terms of Ceramic Mesolithic, Pottery-Mesolithic, Late Mesolithic, Para-Neolithic and Forest Neolithic in reference to these groups. Given the diversity of the Subneolithic cultural landscape, pottery present across the Subneolithic occurs in a variety of styles that evolve over the cultural period geographically. For example, in eastern Europe Subneolithic pottery appears fairly uniform, with limited complexity and diversity.

Common features of pots include:

- Appeared to be built in layers of rings, the pots occasionally have pointed bases (such as within the Narva culture) but are more commonly rounded and wider than the vessel's mouth. Some Subneolithic groups also produced flat-based vessels, such as the Zedmar culture.
- Walls are smooth but may observe a break in their fluidity in the form of a shoulder that gives way to a short, concave neck.
- Rims may be thickened, bevelled or moulded but the pots themselves are notably absent of any handles or lugs.
- Ornamentally, the pottery is usually decorated from the top with horizontal rows of parallel pits followed by parallel rows throughout the vase's body.
- Other common decorative elements include fingernail impressions, simple points and short strokes grouped horizontally which appear on both the body and the rim.
- Impressions by whipped-chord and twisted thread, known as maggot-pattern, occur in horizontal rows or else in a herring-bone arrangement. Later styles integrated the use of short-toothed comb-like depressions.
- A shell temper was characteristic of Subneolithic pottery and in the Ancient Lake Saimaa area asbestos tempers were used for its capacity to strengthen vessels and cooking utensils.

In practice, pottery vessels have been utilised in the processing of aquatic products, as well as the processing of other materials such as beeswax – although this may be indicative of the storage of other matter (i.e. honey), or for its use as a sealant in the creation process.

== Art ==
Art, in the form of rock paintings, is present in Subneolithic sites of Finland. The presence of rock art has been theorised to be tied to shamanism, due to inclusion of metamorphic imagery, though other hypotheses include hunting magic and totemistic theory. Commonly occurring on flat rock faces above water, these paintings are made up of red ochre and are often modest, containing 10 (or less) identifiable objects. Notable sites such as Väikallio, Astuvansalmi and Saraakallio are particularly significant for their abundance of painted images, with Väikallio and Astuvansalmi comprising over 60 identifiable images each. Common motifs include: anthropomorphic figures, elk, boats, hand and paw prints, fish, birds, snakes, and abstract symbols. Some painted images dismiss identification entirely, seemingly due to the wear present on the rock faces, the seeping of red ochre out of the rock itself and as well due to the intentionality of the design.

=== Anthropomorphic figures ===
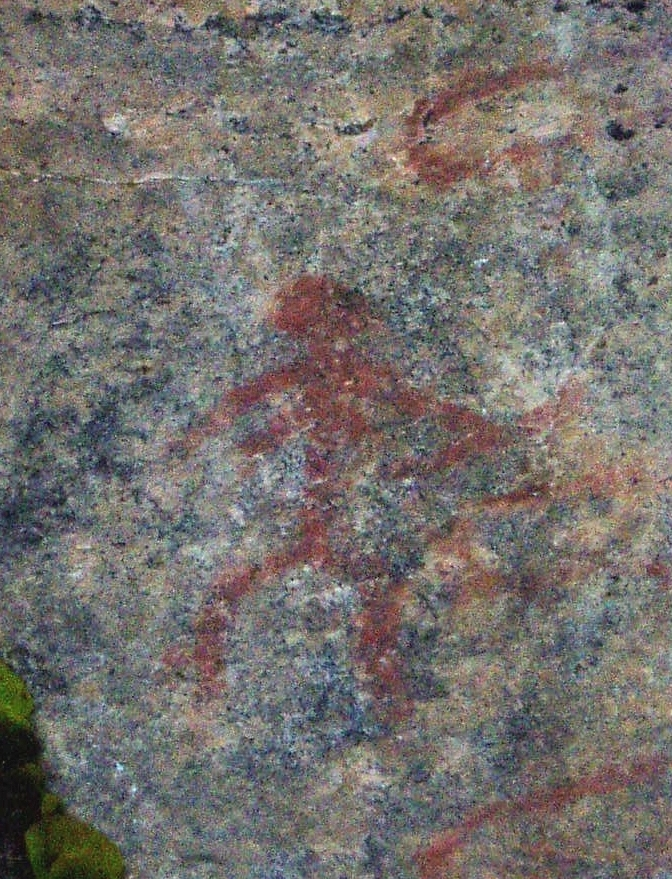
Astuvansalmi Subneolithic rock art at Ristiina, Finland. Known as the 'Artemis’' of Astuvansalmi

Appearing as the most common motifs, these figures appear simplistically and with varying design features. Their heads appear as circles, triangles and dots; some include horns whilst others have characteristics resembling snouts or beaks. The figures largely appear lacking in sexual traits but there are instances of figures appearing with definable genders, such as the inclusion of breasts on 'Artemis' of Astuvansalmi.

=== Elk ===
The majority of elk depictions forgo realism. The depictions, appearing without antlers but including beards, suggests the image of elk in spring, succeeding the winter antler-shedding.

=== Boats ===
This motif appears obscurely as a curved, but sometimes flat, comb-like structure. Its uncertain nature renders its subjective interpretation. The comb teeth have been interpreted as the crew on the boat where, in locations such as Scandinavia and Karelia, the motif appears tied to images of ships. The simplistic and symbolic nature of the motif in other Subneolithic areas, such as Finland, prevent definitive determinations of its nature. Some rock paintings incorporate multiple motifs, further complicating interpretation. The ‘boat’ may appear with an elk head adjoined, at times on its prow and in other instances with the boat melded to the elk's forehead, and even appearing with both elk head and legs.
