= Comb Ceramic culture =

Ancient northeast European culture

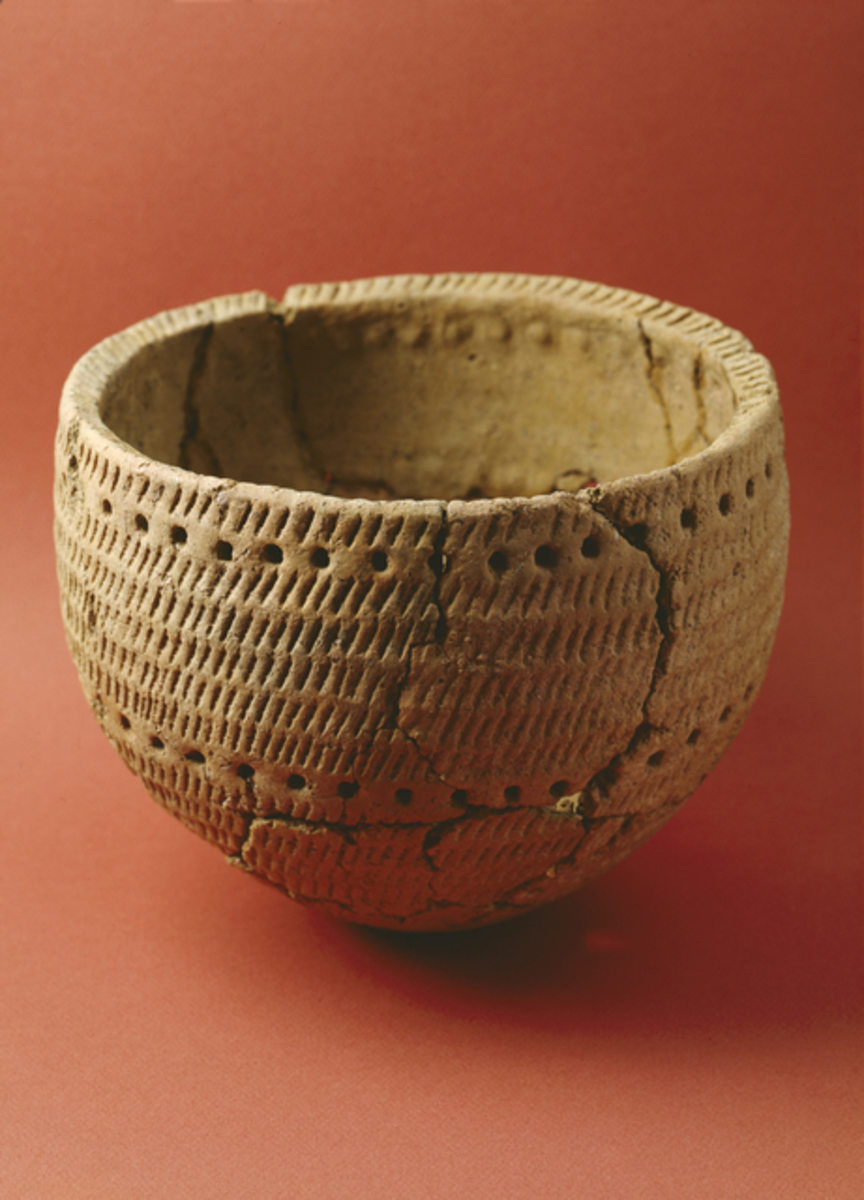
- Geographical range: North-Eastern Europe
- Period: Mesolithic Europe, Neolithic Europe
- Dates: c. 4200–2000 BCE
- Preceded by: Narva culture
- Followed by: Volosovo culture, Corded Ware culture, Kiukainen culture

The Comb Ceramic culture or Pit-Comb Ware culture, often abbreviated as CCC or PCW, was a northeast European culture characterised by its Pit–Comb Ware. It existed from around 4200 BCE to around 2000 BCE. The bearers of the Comb Ceramic culture are thought to have still mostly followed the eastern hunter-gatherer lifestyle typical of the Mesolithic, with traces of early agriculture.

== Distribution ==
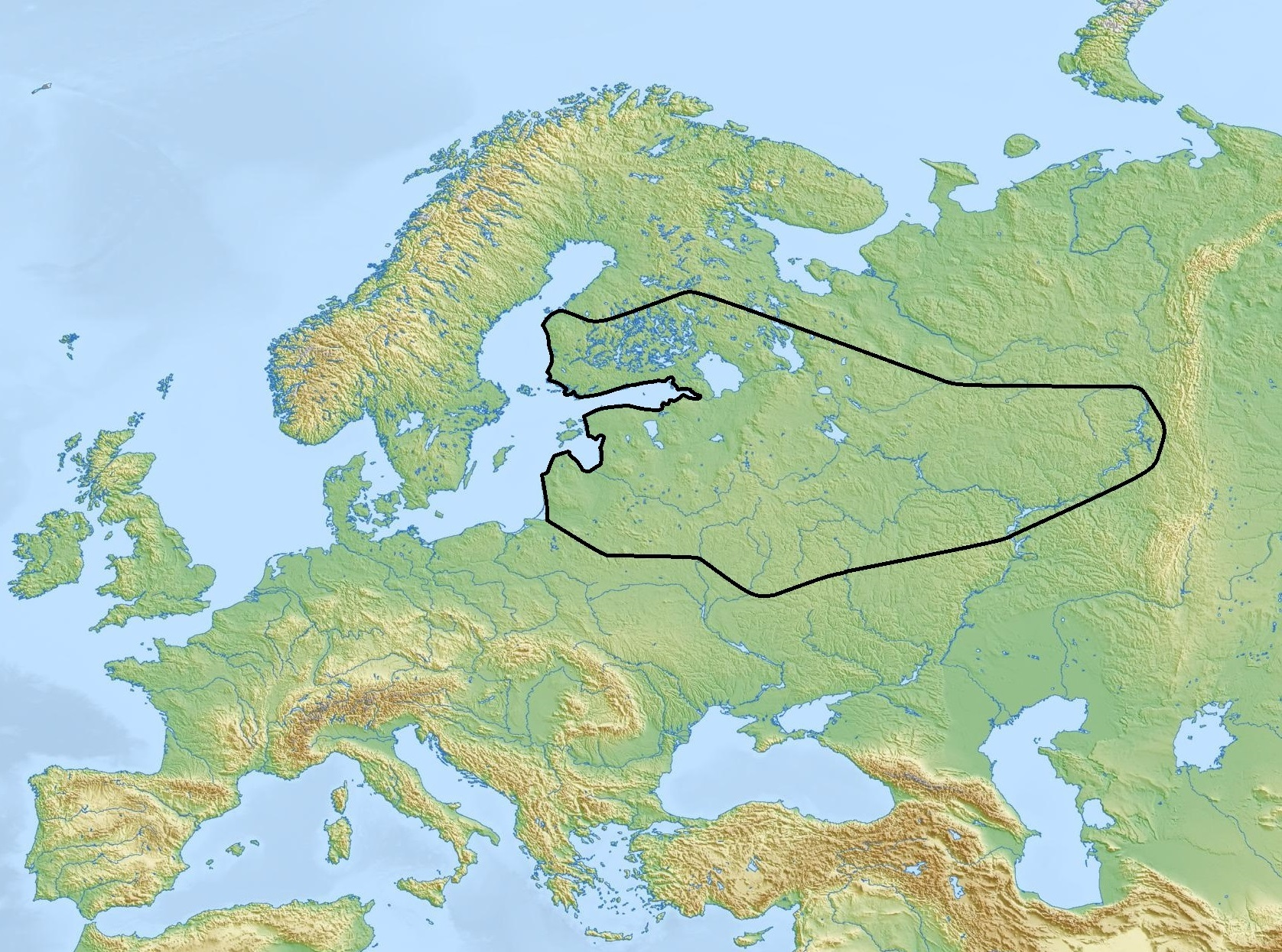
Distribution of the Comb Ceramic culture of Northeast Europe.

The distribution of the artifacts found includes Finnmark (Norway) in the north, the Kalix River (Sweden) and the Gulf of Bothnia (Finland) in the west and the Vistula River (Poland) in the south. It would include the Narva culture of Estonia and the Sperrings culture in Finland, among others. They are thought to have been essentially hunter-gatherers, though e.g. the Narva culture in Estonia shows some evidence of agriculture. Some of this region was absorbed by the later Corded Ware horizon.

== Ceramics ==
The Pit–Comb Ware culture is one of the few exceptions to the rule that pottery and farming coexist in Europe. In the Near East farming appeared before pottery, then when farming spread into Europe from the Near East, pottery-making came with it. However, in Asia, where the oldest pottery has been found, pottery was made long before farming. It appears that the Comb Ceramic Culture reflects influences from Siberia and northern East Asia (see Xinglongwa culture and Jeulmun pottery period for comb-patterned pottery in China and Korea, respectively).

The ceramics consist of large pots that are rounded or pointed below, with a capacity from 40 to 60 litres. The forms of the vessels remained unchanged but the decoration varied.

By dating according to the elevation of land, the ceramics have traditionally (Äyräpää 1930) been divided into the following periods: early (Ka I, c. 4200 BC – 3300 BC), typical (Ka II, c. 3300 BC – 2700 BC) and late Comb Ceramic (Ka III, c. 2800 BC – 2000 BC).

However, calibrated radiocarbon dates for the comb-ware fragments found (e.g., in the Karelian isthmus), give a total interval of 5600 BC – 2300 BC (Geochronometria Vol. 23, pp 93–99, 2004).

Among the many styles of comb ware there is one which makes use of the characteristics of asbestos: Asbestos ware. In this tradition, which persisted through different cultures into the Iron Age, asbestos was used to temper the ceramic clay. Other styles are Pyheensilta, Jäkärlä, Kierikki, Pöljä and Säräisniemi pottery with their respective subdivisions. Sperrings ceramics is the original name given for the younger early Comb ware (Ka I:2) found in Finland.

== Habitations ==
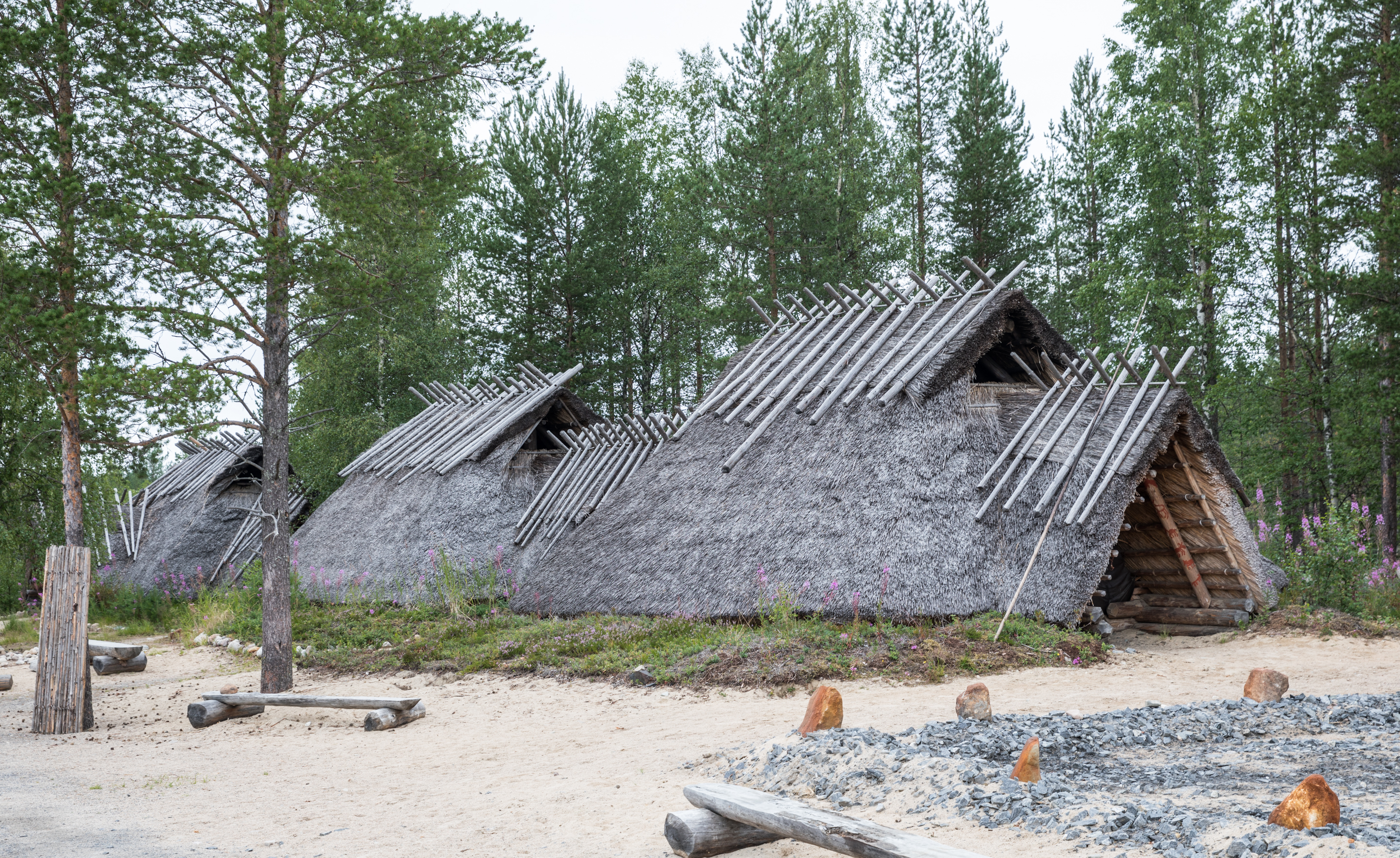
Reconstructions of Stone Age dwellings in Kierikki, Finland

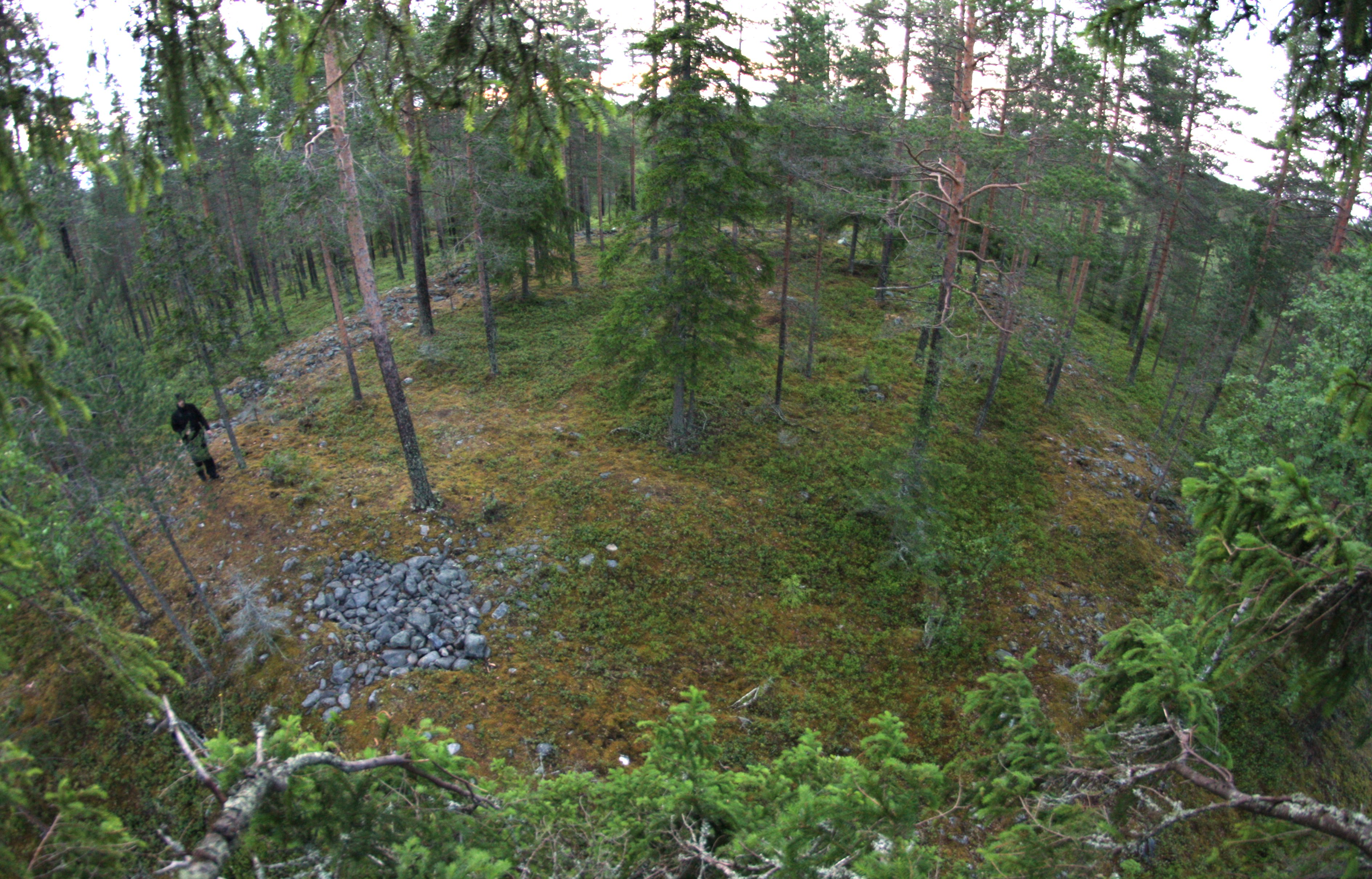
A so-called Giant's Church at Rajakangas, Oulu, Finland. The purpose of these large, rectangular stone structures is unclear.

The settlements were located at sea shores or beside lakes and the economy was based on hunting, fishing and the gathering of plants. In Finland, it was a maritime culture which became more and more specialized in hunting seals. The dominant dwelling was probably a kota of about 30 square meters where some 15 people could live. Also rectangular houses made of timber become popular in Finland from 4000 BC cal. Graves were dug at the settlements and the dead were covered with red ochre. The typical Comb Ceramic age shows an extensive use of objects made of flint and amber as grave offerings.

== Tools ==
The stone tools changed very little over time. They were made of local materials such as slate and quartz. Finds suggest a fairly extensive exchange network: red slate originating from northern Scandinavia, asbestos from Lake Saimaa, green slate from Lake Onega, amber from the southern shores of the Baltic Sea and flint from the Valdai area in northwestern Russia.

== Art ==
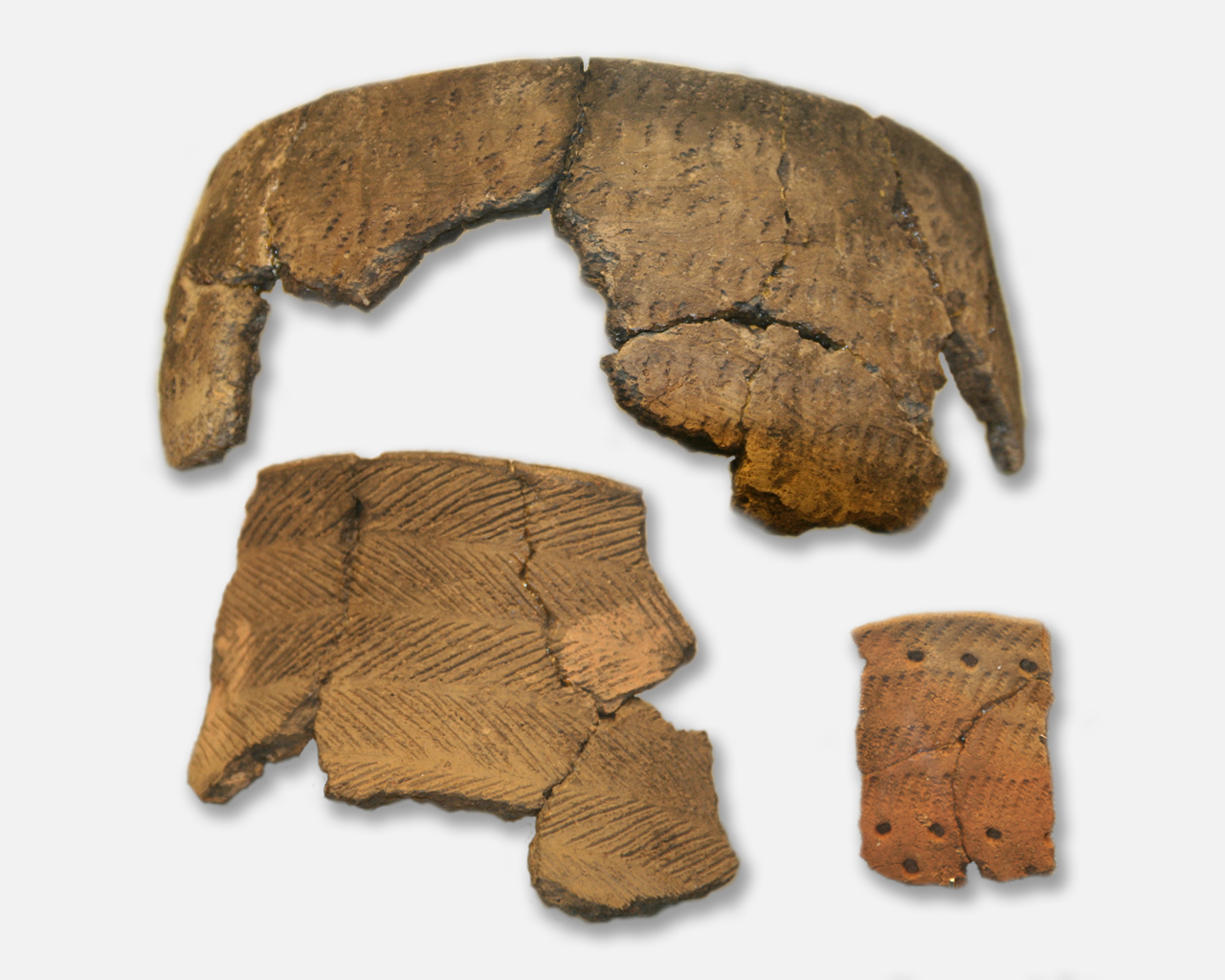
Comb ceramic pottery from Estonia, 4000-2000 BCE.

The culture was characterised by small figurines of burnt clay and animal heads made of stone. The animal heads usually depict moose and bears and were derived from the art of the Mesolithic. There were also many rock paintings.

There are sources noting that the typical comb ceramic pottery had a sense of luxury and that its makers knew how to wear precious amber pendants.

== Language ==
In earlier times, it was often suggested that the spread of the Comb Ware people was correlated with the diffusion of the Uralic languages, and thus an early Uralic language would have been spoken throughout this culture. It was also suggested that bearers of this culture likely spoke Finno-Ugric languages. Another view is that the Comb Ware people may have spoken Palaeo-European languages, as some toponyms and hydronyms also indicate a non-Uralic, non-Indo-European language at work in some areas. In addition, modern scholars have located the Proto-Uralic homeland east of the Volga, if not even beyond the Urals. The great westward dispersal of the Uralic languages is suggested to have happened long after the demise of the Comb Ceramic culture, perhaps in the 1st millennium BC.

== Genetics ==
Saag et al. (2017) analyzed three CCC individuals buried at Kudruküla as belonging to Y-hg R1a5-YP1272 (R1a1b~ after ISOGG 2020), along with three mtDNA samples of mt-hg U5b1d1, U4a and U2e1.

Mittnik (2018) analyzed two CCC individuals. The male carried R1 (2021: R1b-M343) and U4d2, while the female carried U5a1d2b. Generally, the CCC individuals were mostly of Eastern Hunter-Gatherer (EHG) descent, with even more EHG than people of the Narva culture.

Lamnidis et al. (2018) found 15% Western Hunter-Gatherer (WHG) ancestry, 65% Eastern Hunter-Gatherer (EHG) - higher than among earlier cultures of the eastern Baltic, and 20% Western Steppe Herder (WSH).

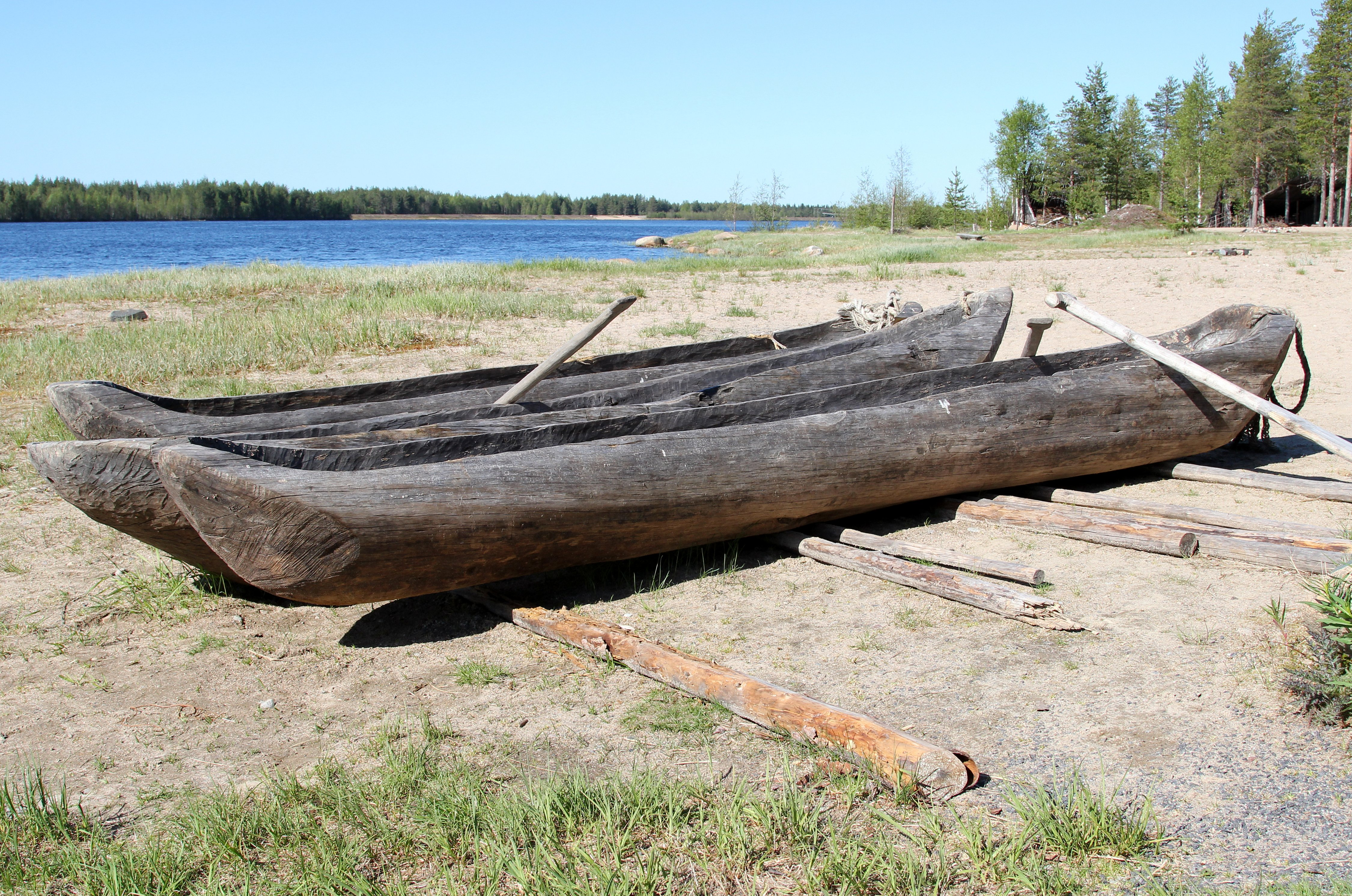
Dugout canoes, reconstruction

== See also ==
- Pitted Ware culture
- Dnieper–Donets culture
- Rzucewo culture
- Pre-Finno-Ugric substrate

== Sources ==
- Lamnidis, TC (November 27, 2018). "Ancient Fennoscandian genomes reveal origin and spread of Siberian ancestry in Europe". Nature Communications. 9 (5018). Nature Research: 2185–2193. Bibcode:2018NatCo...9.5018L. doi:10.1038/s41467-018-07483-5. PMC 6258758. PMID 30479341.
- Mallory, J. P.; Adams, Douglas Q. (1997). "Pit-Comb Ware Culture". Encyclopedia of Indo-European Culture. Taylor & Francis. pp. 429–430. ISBN 1884964982.
- Mittnik, Alisa (January 30, 2018). "The genetic prehistory of the Baltic Sea region". Nature Communications. 16 (1). Nature Research: 442. Bibcode:2018NatCo...9..442M. doi:10.1038/s41467-018-02825-9. PMC 5789860. PMID 29382937.
- Saag, Lehti (July 24, 2017). "Extensive Farming in Estonia Started through a Sex-Biased Migration from the Steppe". Current Biology. 27 (14). Cell Press: 2185–2193. doi:10.1016/j.cub.2017.06.022. PMID 28712569.
- Zvelebil, Marek (2004). "Pitted Ware And Related Cultures Of Neolithic Northern Europe". In Bogucki, Peter I.; Crabtree, Pam J. (eds.). Ancient Europe 8000 B.C.- A.D. 1000. Encyclopedia of the Barbarian World. Vol. 1. Scribner. pp. 431–435. ISBN 068480669X.
