= Narva culture =

Archaeological culture

- Geographical range: Europe
- Period: Mesolithic
- Dates: c. 5300 — c. 1750 BC
- Type site: Narva River
- Preceded by: Kunda culture
- Followed by: Pit–Comb Ware culture, Corded Ware culture, Brushed Pottery culture

The Narva culture or eastern Baltic was a European Neolithic archaeological culture in present-day Estonia, Latvia, Lithuania, Kaliningrad Oblast (former East Prussia), and adjacent portions of Poland, Belarus and Russia. A successor of the Mesolithic Kunda culture, the Narva culture continued up to the start of the Bronze Age. The culture spanned from c. 5300 to 1750 BC. The technology was that of hunter-gatherers. The culture was named after the Narva River in Estonia.

== Technology and artifacts ==
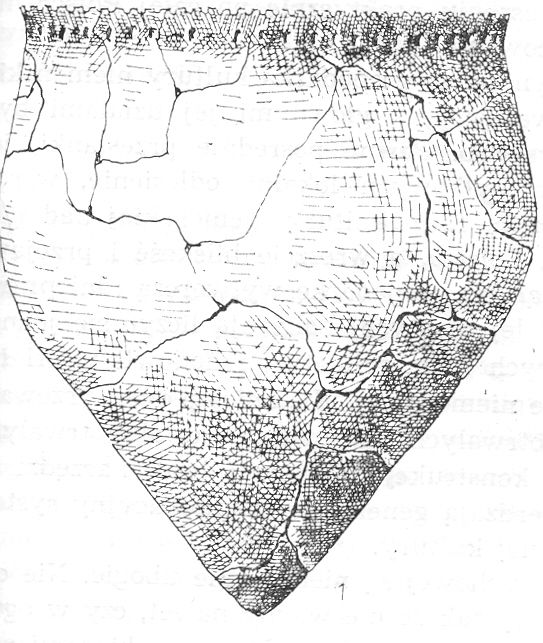
Pottery of the Narva culture

The people of the Narva culture had little access to flint; therefore, they were forced to trade and conserve their flint resources. For example, there were very few flint arrowheads and flint was often reused. The Narva culture relied on local materials (bone, horn, schist). As evidence of trade, researchers found pieces of pink flint from Valdai Hills and plenty of typical Narva pottery in the territory of the Neman culture while no objects from the Neman culture were found in Narva. Heavy use of bones and horns is one of the main characteristics of the Narva culture. The bone tools, continued from the predecessor Kunda culture, provide the best evidence of continuity of the Narva culture throughout the Neolithic period. The people were buried on their backs with few grave goods. The Narva culture also used and traded amber; a few hundred items were found in Juodkrantė. One of the most famous artifacts is a ceremonial cane carved of horn as a head of female elk found in Šventoji.

The people were primarily fishers, hunters, and gatherers. They slowly began adopting husbandry in the middle Neolithic. They were not nomadic and lived in the same settlements for long periods as evidenced by abundant pottery, middens, and structures built in lakes and rivers to help fishing. The pottery shared similarities with the Comb Ceramic culture, but had specific characteristics. One of the most persistent features was mixing clay with other organic matter, most often crushed snail shells. The pottery was made of 6-to-9 cm (2.4-to-3.5 in) wide clay strips with minimal decorations around the rim. The vessels were wide and large; the height and the width were often the same. The bottoms were pointed or rounded, and only the latest examples have narrow flat bottoms. From mid-Neolithic, Narva pottery was influenced and eventually disappeared into the Corded Ware culture.

== History of research ==
For a long time, archaeologists believed that the first inhabitants of the region were Finno-Ugric, who were pushed north by people of the Corded Ware culture. In 1931, Latvian archaeologist Eduards Šturms was the first to note that artifacts found near the Zebrus Lake in Latvia were different and possibly belonged to a separate archaeological culture. In early 1950s settlements on the Narva River were excavated. Lembit Jaanits and Nina Gurina grouped the findings with similar artifacts from eastern Baltic region and described the Narva culture.

At first, it was believed that Narva culture ended with the appearance of the Corded Ware culture. However, newer research extended it up to the Bronze Age. As Narva culture spanned several millennia and encompassed a large territory, archaeologists attempted to subdivide the culture into regions or periods. For example, in Lithuania two regions are distinguished: southern (under influence of the Neman culture) and western (with major settlements found in Šventoji). There is an academic debate what ethnicity the Narva culture represented: Finno-Ugrians or other Europids, preceding the arrival of the Indo-Europeans. It is also unclear how the Narva culture fits with the arrival of the Indo-Europeans (Corded Ware and Globular Amphora cultures) and the formation of the Baltic tribes.

== Genetics ==
Mathieson (2015) analyzed a large number of individuals buried at the Zvejnieki burial ground, most of whom were affiliated with the Kunda culture and the succeeding Narva culture. The mtDNA extracted belonged exclusively to haplotypes of U5, U4 and U2. With regards to Y-DNA, the vast majority of samples belonged to R1b1a1a haplotypes and I2a1 haplotypes. The results affirmed that the Kunda and Narva cultures were about 70% WHG and 30% EHG. The nearby contemporary Pit–Comb Ware culture was on the contrary found to be about 65% EHG. An individual from the Corded Ware culture, which would eventually succeed the Narva culture, was found to have genetic relations with the Yamnaya culture.

Jones et al. (2017) examined the remains of a male of the Narva culture buried c. 5780-5690 BC. He was found to be a carrier of the paternal haplogroup R1b1b and the maternal haplogroup U2e1. People of the Narva culture and preceding Kunda culture were determined to have closer genetic affinity with Western Hunter-Gatherers (WHGs) than Eastern Hunter-Gatherers (EHGs).

Saag et al. (2017) determined haplogroup U5a2d in a Narva male.

Mittnik et al. (2018) analyzed 24 Narva individuals. Of the four samples of Y-DNA extracted, one belonged to I2a1a2a1a, one belonged to I2a1b, one belonged to I, and one belonged to R1. Of the ten samples of mtDNA extracted, eight belonged to U5 haplotypes, one belonged to U4a1, and one belonged to H11. U5 haplotypes were common among Western Hunter-Gatherers (WHGs) and Scandinavian Hunter-Gatherers (SHGs). Genetic influence from Eastern Hunter-Gatherers (EHGs) was also detected.

== See also ==
- Pitted Ware culture
- Rzucewo culture
- Dnieper-Donets culture

== Sources ==
- Jones, Eppie R. (February 20, 2017). "The Neolithic Transition in the Baltic Was Not Driven by Admixture with Early European Farmers". Current Biology. 27 (4). Cell Press: 576–582. doi:10.1016/j.cub.2016.12.060. PMC 5321670. PMID 28162894.
- Mathieson, Iain (February 21, 2018). "The Genomic History of Southeastern Europe". Nature. 555 (7695). Nature Research: 197–203. Bibcode:2018Natur.555..197M. doi:10.1038/nature25778. PMC 6091220. PMID 29466330.
- Mittnik, Alisa (January 30, 2018). "The genetic prehistory of the Baltic Sea region". Nature Communications. 16 (1). Nature Research: 442. Bibcode:2018NatCo...9..442M. doi:10.1038/s41467-018-02825-9. PMC 5789860. PMID 29382937.
- Saag, Lehti (July 24, 2017). "Extensive Farming in Estonia Started through a Sex-Biased Migration from the Steppe". Current Biology. 27 (14). Cell Press: 2185–2193. doi:10.1016/j.cub.2017.06.022. PMID 28712569.
