= Ardon =

Ardon or Ardón may refer to:

== People ==
Last name

- Gustavo Ardón, Honduran television presenter
- Leslie Ardon (b. 1979), French basketball player
- Mordecai Ardon (1896–1992), Israeli painter
- Rick Ardon (b. 1959), Australian news presenter
- Tyler Ardon, Canadian rugby sevens player who participated in the 2011 Pan American Games
- Araceli Ardón (b. 1958), Mexican writer
- Gabriel García Ardón, a member of the National Congress of Honduras in 2006–2010
- José Ardón (born 2000), Guatemalan footballer

First name

- Ardon Bess, Canadian actor
- Ardon Benjamin Holcomb, second husband (1856-1879) of Caroline Soule, American writer

== Places ==
Populated places

- Ardon, Loiret, a commune of the Loiret Département, France
- Ardon, Jura, a commune of the Jura Département, France
- Ardon, Russia, several inhabited localities in Russia
- Ardon, Switzerland, a village in the Canton of Valais, Switzerland
- Ardon, Iowa, a former townsite and unincorporated community in Iowa, United States
- Ardón, a village in the Province of León, Spain

Other geographical features

- Ardon (river), a river in the Republic of North Ossetia-Alania, Russia, which flows into the Terek
- Har Ardon, a mountain in the protected area of Makhtesh Ramon, Israel

== Other uses ==
- Ardon, a world in the computer game Crusaders of Might and Magic

== See also ==
- Panic in the House of Ardon, a 1920 German silent crime film
- Ardonsky (disambiguation)
