= Eastern hunter-gatherer =

Archaeogenetic name for an ancestral genetic component

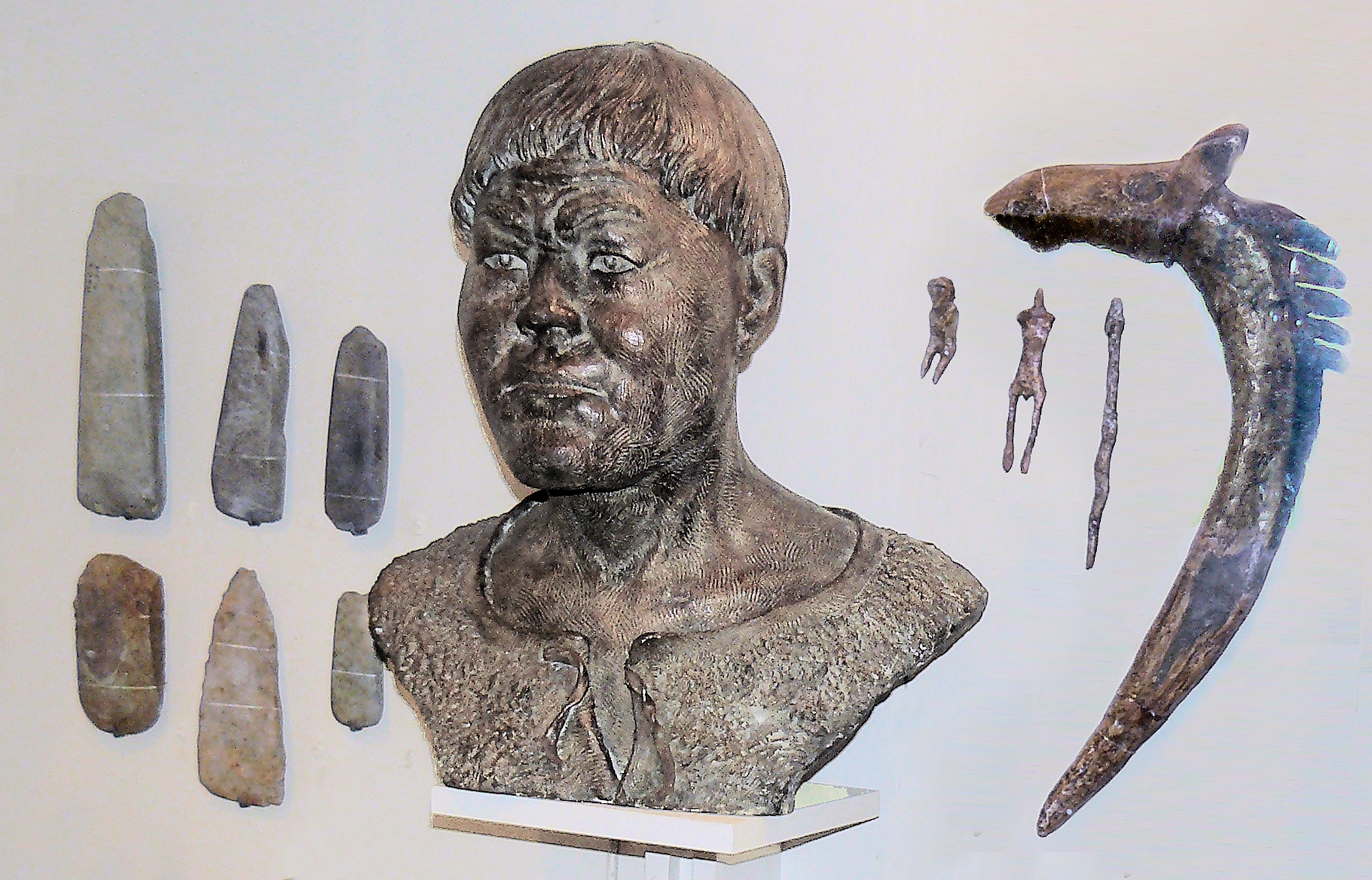
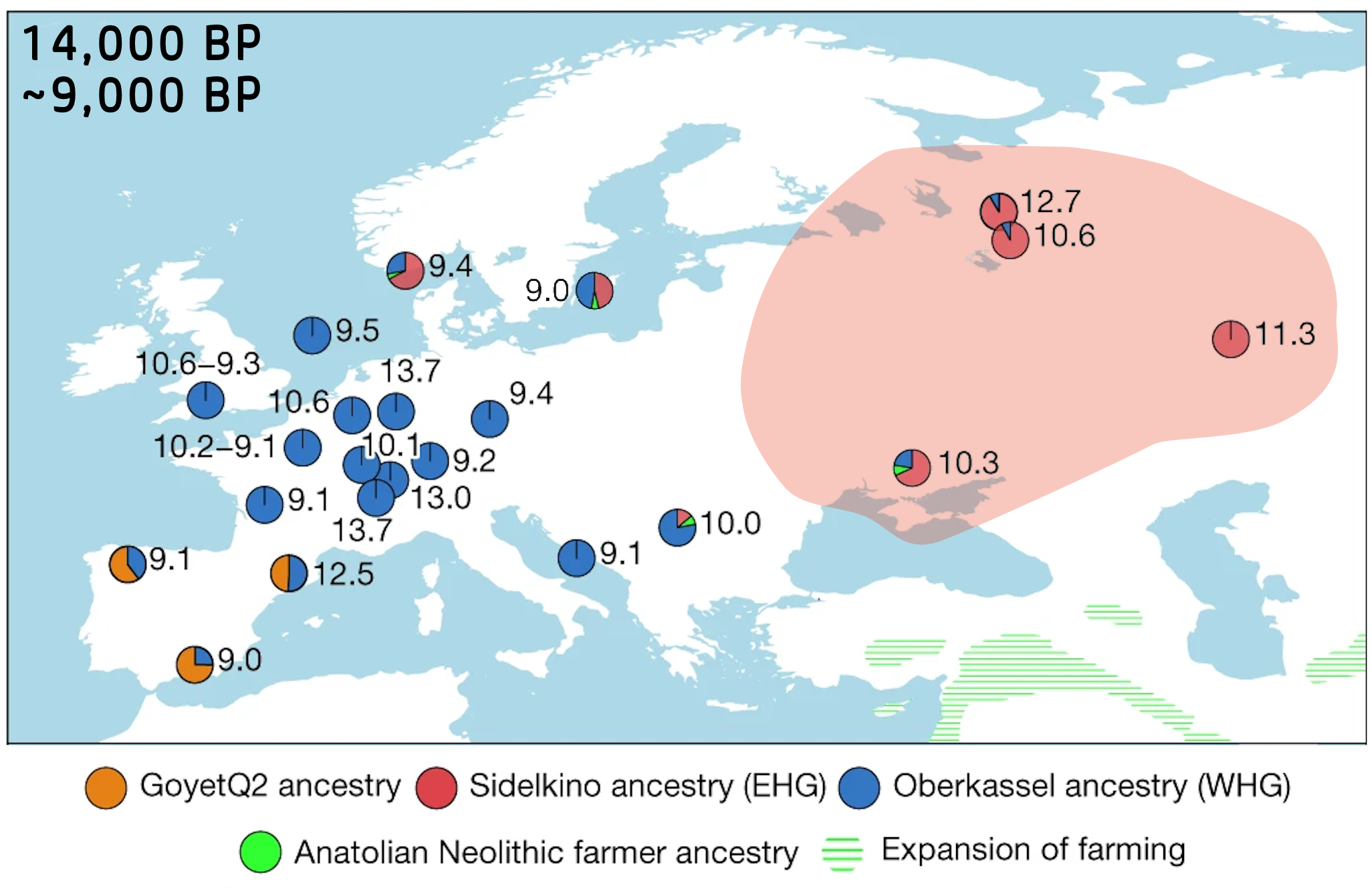
- Artifacts and forensic reconstruction of an eastern hunter-gatherer from the site of Yuzhny Oleny island (dated c. 8,100 BP), by M. M. Gerasimov. National Museum of Karelia. Hunter-gatherers in Europe between 14 ka and 9 ka, with the main area of Eastern Hunter-Gatherers (EHG, ). Individual numbers correspond to calibrated sample dates.

In archaeogenetics, eastern hunter-gatherers (EHG), sometimes called east European hunter-gatherers or eastern European hunter-gatherers (EEHG), are a distinct ancestral component which represents the Mesolithic hunter-gatherers of Eastern Europe.

The eastern hunter-gatherer genetic profile is mainly derived from Ancient North Eurasian (ANE) ancestry, which was introduced from Siberia, with a secondary and smaller admixture of European western hunter-gatherers (WHG). However, the relationship between the ANE and EHG ancestral components is not yet well-understood due to lack of samples that could bridge the spatiotemporal gap.

During the Mesolithic era, the EHGs inhabited an area which stretched from the Baltic Sea to the Ural Mountains, and southward to the Pontic–Caspian steppe. Along with Scandinavian hunter-gatherers (SHG) and western hunter-gatherers (WHG), the EHGs constituted one of the three main genetic groups in the postglacial period of early Holocene Europe. The border between WHGs and EHGs ran roughly from the lower Danube, northward along the western forests of the Dnieper towards the western Baltic Sea.

During the Neolithic and early Eneolithic eras, EHGs on the Pontic–Caspian steppe mixed with Caucasus hunter-gatherers (CHGs), with the resulting population, which was almost half-EHG and half-CHG, forming the genetic cluster that is known as Western Steppe Herder (WSH). WSH populations that were closely related to the people of the Yamnaya culture embarked upon a massive migration which lead to the spread of Indo-European languages throughout large parts of Eurasia.

== Research ==
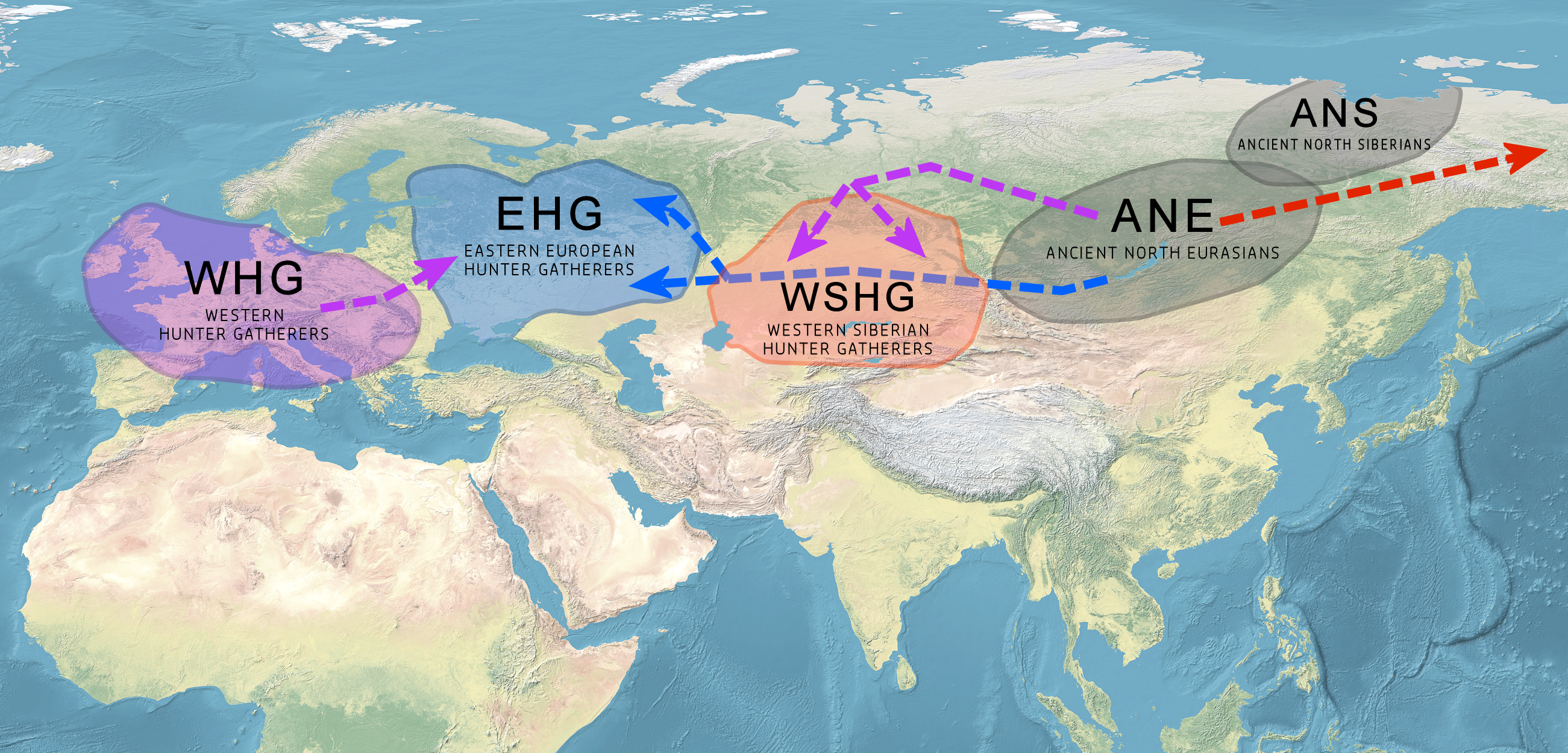
A schematic formation of the EHGs, through a main ancestry of Ancient North Eurasians (ANE), and a smaller admixture of WHGs

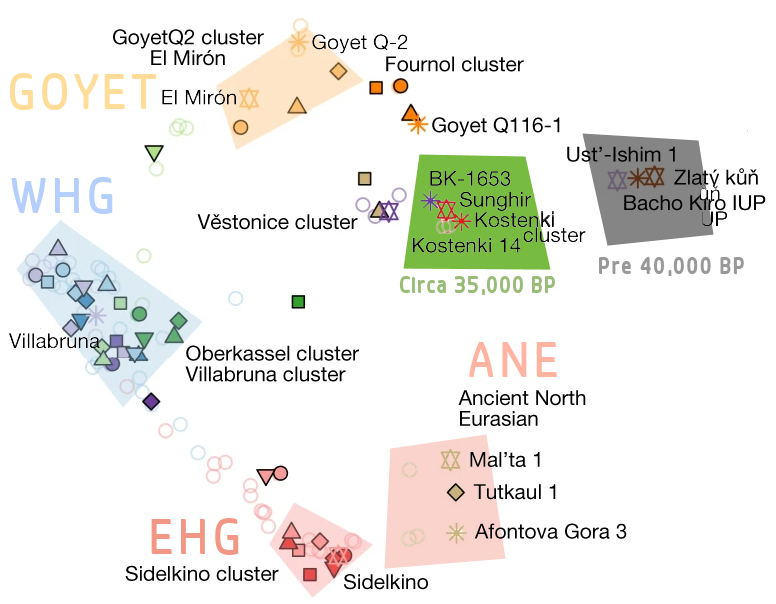
Genetically, the EHG (red) were most closely related to the ANE (pink).

Haak et al. (2015) identified the EHG as a distinct genetic cluster in two males only. The EHG male of Samara (dated to ca. 5650–5550 BC) carried Y-haplogroup R1b1a1a* and mt-haplogroup U5a1d. The other EHG male, buried in Karelia (dated to ca. 5500-5000 BC) carried Y-haplogroup R1a1 and mt-haplogroup C1g. The authors of the study also identified a WHG cluster and an SHG cluster, intermediate between WHG and EHG. (Note: Lazaridis et al. (2016) found SHGs to be a mix of EHGs and WHGs: "Eastern Hunter Gatherers (EHG) derive 3/4 of their ancestry from the ANE... Scandinavian hunter-gatherers (SHG) are a mix of EHG and WHG; and WHG are a mix of EHG and the Upper Paleolithic Bichon from Switzerland.") They suggested that EHGs harbored mixed ancestry from Ancient North Eurasians (ANEs) and WHGs.

Researchers have proposed various admixture proportion models for EHGs from WHGs and ANEs. Posth et al. (2023) found that most EHG individuals carried c. 70% ANE ancestry and c. 30% WHG ancestry. The WHG-like ancestry was most likely not derived from the Oberkassel and Villabruna clusters directly, but from a related and yet unsampled Epigravettian population.

The high contribution from Ancient North Eurasians is also visible in a subtle affinity of the EHG to the 40,000-year-old Tianyuan man from Northern China and other East/Southeast Asians, which can be explained by geneflow from a Tianyuan-related source into the ANE lineage (represented by Malta and Afontova Gora 3), which later substantially contributed to the formation of the EHG.

The formation of the EHG ancestral component is estimated to have happened 13,000–15,000 years BP. EHG associated remains belonged primarily to the human Y-chromosome haplogroups R1, with a lower frequency of haplogroup J and Q. Their mitochondrial chromosomes belonged primarily to haplogroup U2, U4, U5, as well as C1 and R1b. Geneflow from an East Asian-like source towards the EHG contributed around 9.4% (4.4%–14.7%).

EHGs may have mixed with "an Armenian-like Near Eastern source", which formed the Yamnaya culture, as early as the Eneolithic (5200-4000 BC). The people of the Yamnaya culture were found to be a mix of EHG and a "Near Eastern related population". During the 3rd millennium BC, the Yamnaya people embarked on a massive expansion throughout Europe, which significantly altered the genetic landscape of the continent. The expansion gave rise to cultures such as Corded Ware, and was possibly the source of the distribution of Indo-European languages in Europe.

The people of the Mesolithic Kunda culture and the Narva culture of the eastern Baltic were a mix of WHG and EHG, showing the closest affinity with WHG. Samples from the Ukrainian Mesolithic and Neolithic were found to cluster tightly together between WHG and EHG, suggesting genetic continuity in the Dnieper rapids for a period of 4,000 years. The Ukrainian samples belonged exclusively to the maternal haplogroup U, which is found in around 80% of all European hunter-gatherer samples.

The people of the Pit–Comb Ware culture (PCW/CCC) of the eastern Baltic bear 65% EHG ancestry. This is in contrast to earlier hunter-gatherers in the area, who were more closely related to WHG. This was demonstrated using a sample of Y-DNA extracted from a Pit–Comb Ware individual. This belonged to R1a5-YP1272. The four samples of mtDNA extracted constituted two samples of U5b1d1, one sample of U5a2d, and one sample of U4a.

Günther et al. (2018) analyzed 13 SHGs and found all of them to be of EHG ancestry. Generally, SHGs from western and northern Scandinavia had more EHG ancestry (ca 49%) than individuals from eastern Scandinavia (ca. 38%). The authors suggested that the SHGs were a mix of WHGs who had migrated into Scandinavia from the south, and EHGs who had later migrated into Scandinavia from the northeast along the Norwegian coast. SHGs displayed higher frequences of genetic variants that cause light skin (SLC45A2 and SLC24A5), and light eyes (OCA/Herc2), than WHGs and EHGs.

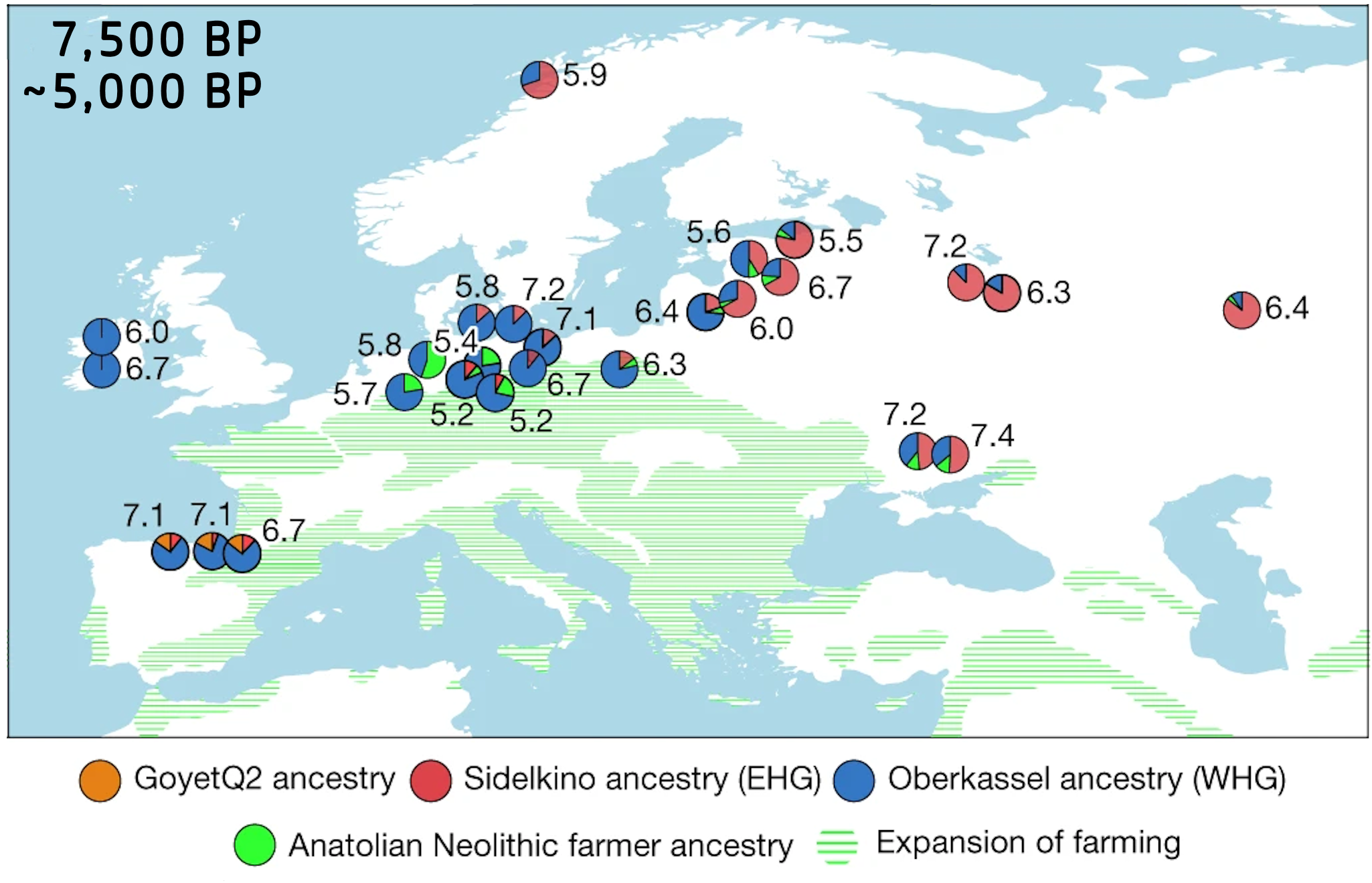
The residual genetic ancestry of European hunter-gatherers during the European Neolithic, between 7.5 ka and 5 ka BP (c. 5,500~3,000 BC)

Members of the Kunda culture and Narva culture were also found to be more closely related with WHG, while the Pit–Comb Ware culture was more closely related to EHG. Northern and eastern areas of the eastern Baltic were found to be more closely related to EHG than southern areas. The study noted that EHGs, like SHGs and Baltic hunter-gatherers, carried high frequencies of the derived alleles for SLC24A5 and SLC45A2, which are codings for light skin.

Mathieson et al. (2018) analyzed the genetics of a large number of skeletons of prehistoric Eastern Europe. Thirty-seven samples were from Mesolithic and Neolithic Ukraine (9500-6000 BC). These were classified as intermediate between EHG and SHG. The males belonged exclusively to R haplotypes (particularly subclades of R1b1 and R1a) and I haplotypes (particularly subclades of I2). Mitochondrial DNA belonged almost exclusively to U (particularly subclades of U5 and U4).

A large number of individuals from the Zvejnieki burial ground, which mostly belonged to the Kunda culture and Narva culture in the eastern Baltic, were analyzed. These individuals were mostly of WHG descent in the earlier phases, but over time EHG ancestry became predominant. The Y-DNA of this site belonged almost exclusively to haplotypes of haplogroup R1b1a1a and I2a1. The mtDNA belonged exclusively to haplogroup U (particularly subclades of U2, U4 and U5).

Forty individuals from three sites of the Iron Gates Mesolithic in the Balkans were estimated to be of 85% WHG and 15% EHG descent. The males at these sites carried exclusively R1b1a and I (mostly subclades of I2a) haplotypes. mtDNA belonged mostly to U (particularly subclades of U5 and U4).

People of the Cucuteni–Trypillia culture were found to harbor about 20% hunter-gatherer ancestry, which was intermediate between EHG and WHG.

Narasimshan et al. (2019) coined a new ancestral component, West Siberian Hunter-Gatherer (WSHG). WSHGs contained about 20% EHG ancestry, 73% ANE ancestry, and 6% East Asian ancestry.

According to Irving-Pease et al. (2024), EHG ancestry peaks in present populations from Finland, Estonia, Mongolia and Central Asia.

=== Possible association with Early Indo-European ===
The EHG have been argued by some to represent a possible source for the Pre-Proto-Indo-European language (see also Father Tongue hypothesis). Unlike the Yamnaya culture people (or closely related groups), which are associated with speakers of Proto-Indo-European, the EHG-rich Dnieper–Donets culture people show no evidence of Caucasus Hunter-Gatherer (CHG) or Early European Farmer (EEF) ancestry.

Both Dnieper-Donets males and Yamnaya males carry the same paternal haplogroups (R1b and I2a), suggesting that the CHG and EEF admixture among the Yamnaya came through EHG males mixing with EEF and CHG females. According to David W. Anthony, this suggests that the Indo-European languages were initially spoken by EHGs living in Eastern Europe.

Others have suggested that the Indo-European language family may have originated not in Eastern Europe, but among CHG-rich West Asian populations South of the Caucasus which later absorbed EHG-rich groups North of the Caucasus. It was noted that haplogroups may not correlate with autosomal ancestry components and historical language dispersals.

== Physical appearance ==
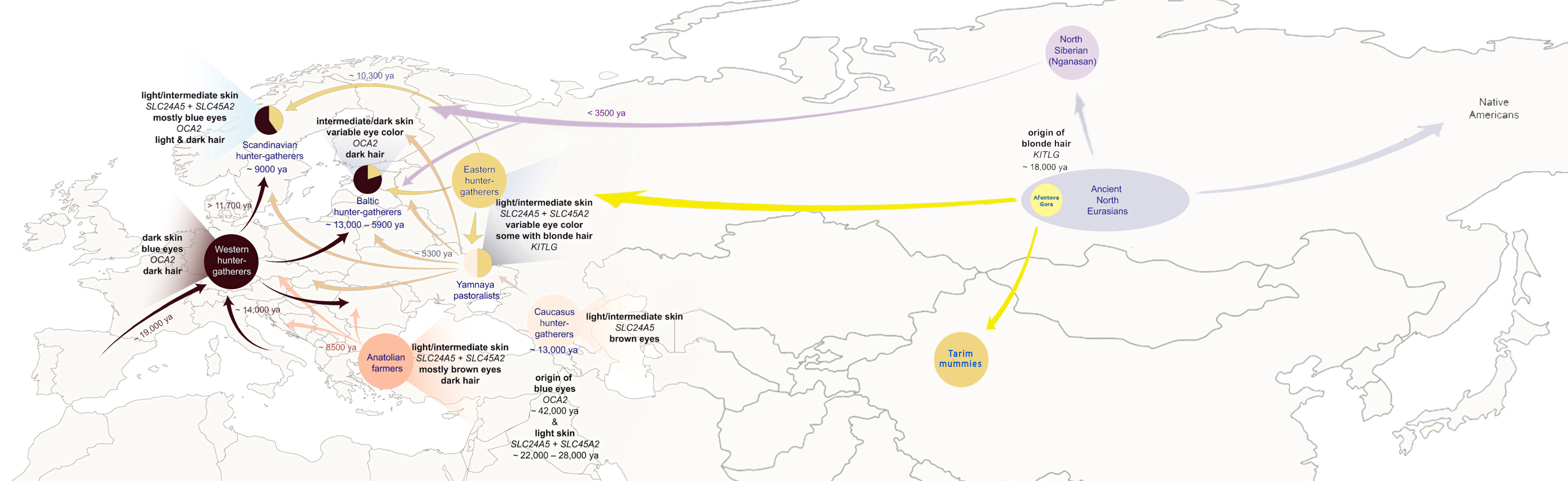
The mutation for blond hair is thought to have originated among the Afontova Gora population of the Ancient North Eurasian (ANE) cline of south-central Siberia.

The EHGs are suggested to have had mostly brown eyes and light skin, with "intermediate frequencies of the blue-eye variants" and "high frequencies of the light-skin variants." An EHG from Karelia was determined by Günther (2018) to have high probabilities of being brown-eyed and dark haired, with a predicted intermediate skin tone. Another EHG from Samara was predicted to be light skinned, and was determined to have a high probability of being blue-eyed with a light hair shade, with a 75% calculated probability of being blond-haired.

The rs12821256 allele of the KITLG gene that controls melanocyte development and melanin synthesis, which is associated with blond hair and first found in an individual from Siberia dated to around 17,000 BP, is found in three Eastern Hunter-Gatherers from Samara, Motala and Ukraine c. 10,000 BP, suggesting that this allele originated in the Ancient North Eurasian population, before spreading to western Eurasia.

Many remains of East Hunter-Gatherers dated to circa 8,100 BP (6,100 BCE) have also been excavated at Yuzhny Oleny island in Lake Onega. The Ancient North Eurasian (ANE) ancestry is by far the main component of the Yuzhny Oleny group, and is among the highest within the rest of the Eastern Hunter-Gatherers (EHG).

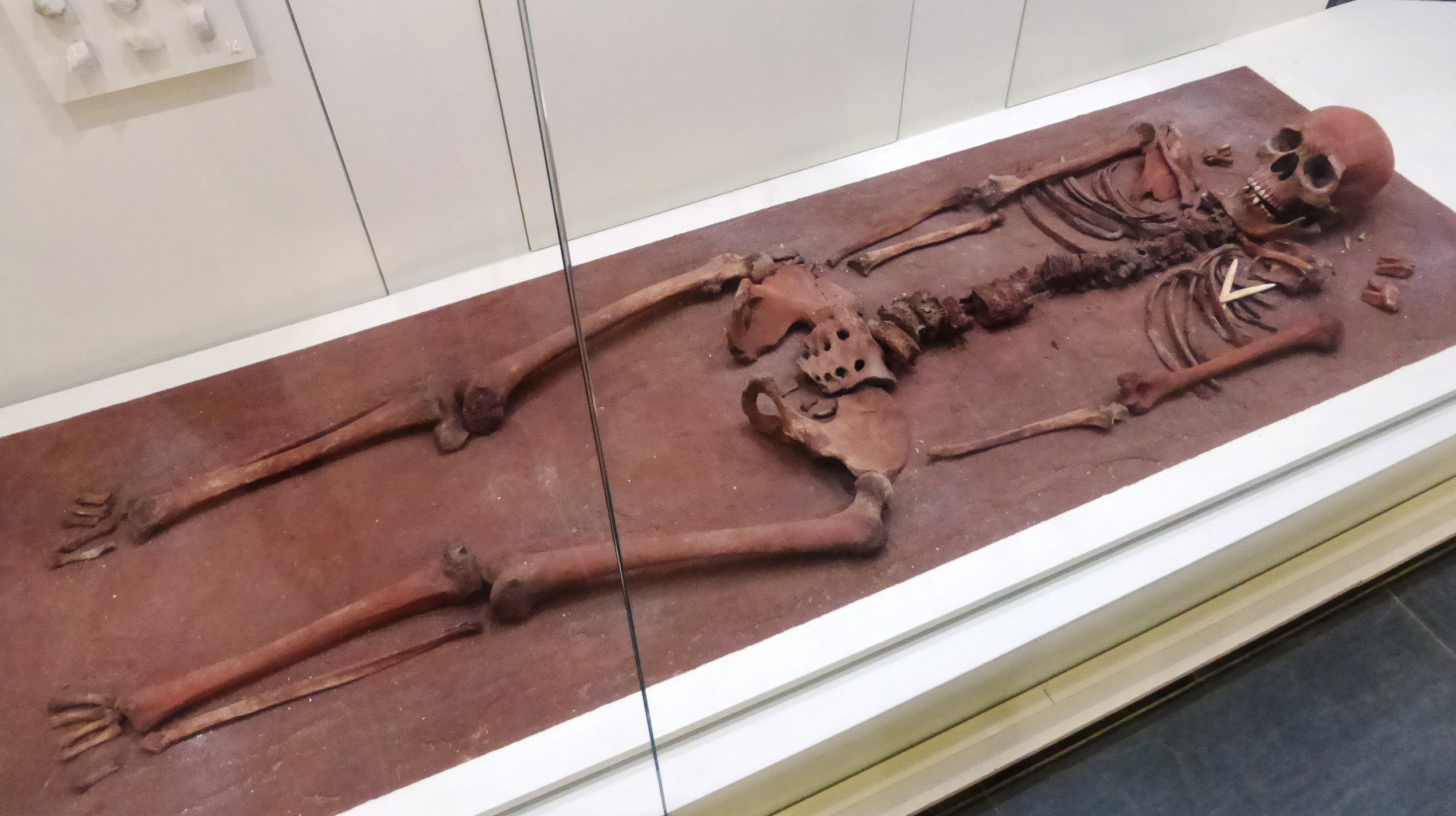
A reconstruction of burial No. 132 of the Oleneostrovsky burial ground (Yuzhni Oleny island, Lake Onega). Exhibit of the National Museum of the Republic of Karelia.

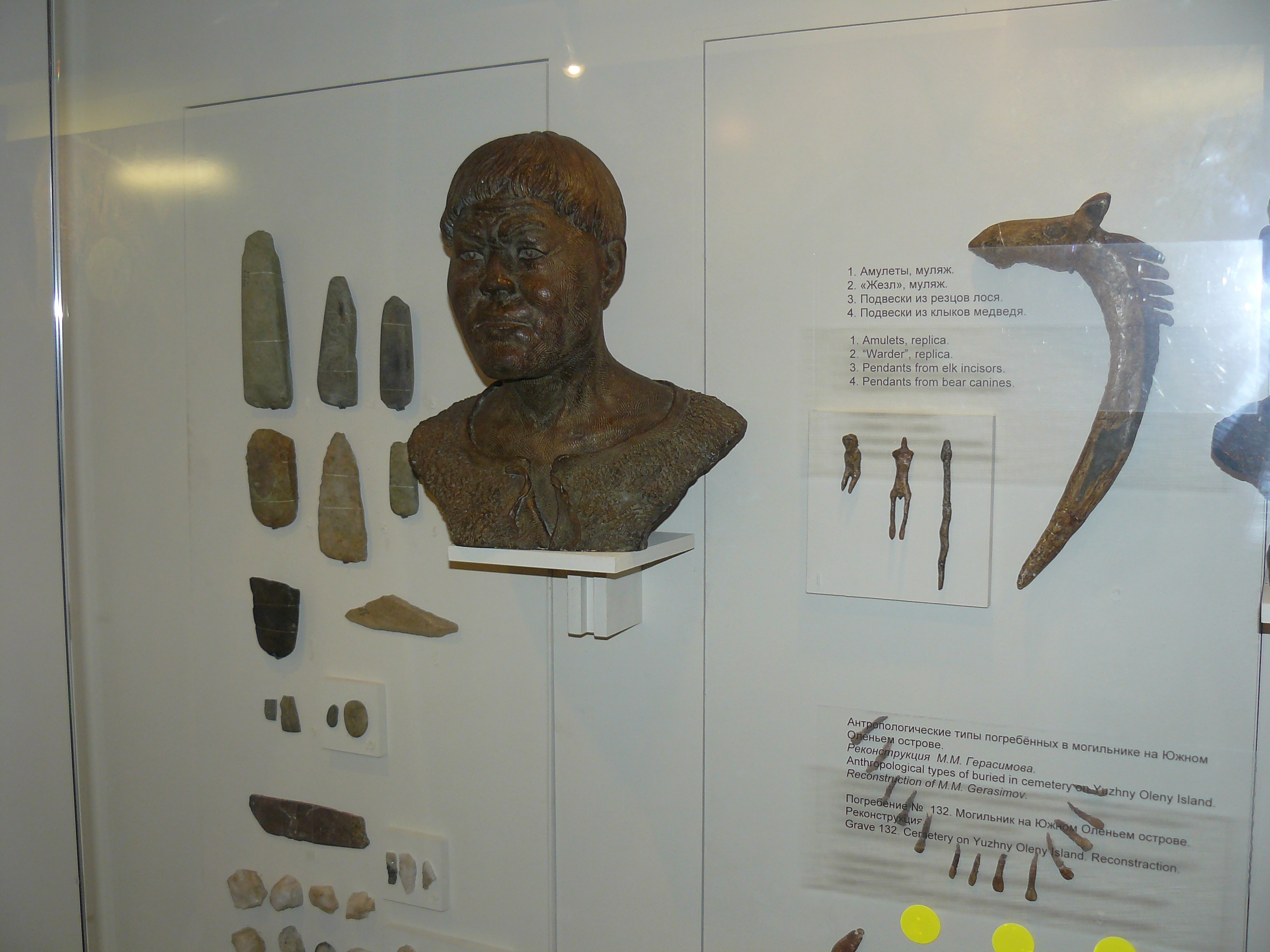
Artifacts and a reconstruction of Eastern Hunter-Gatherers from Yuzhny Oleny island by Gerasimov.

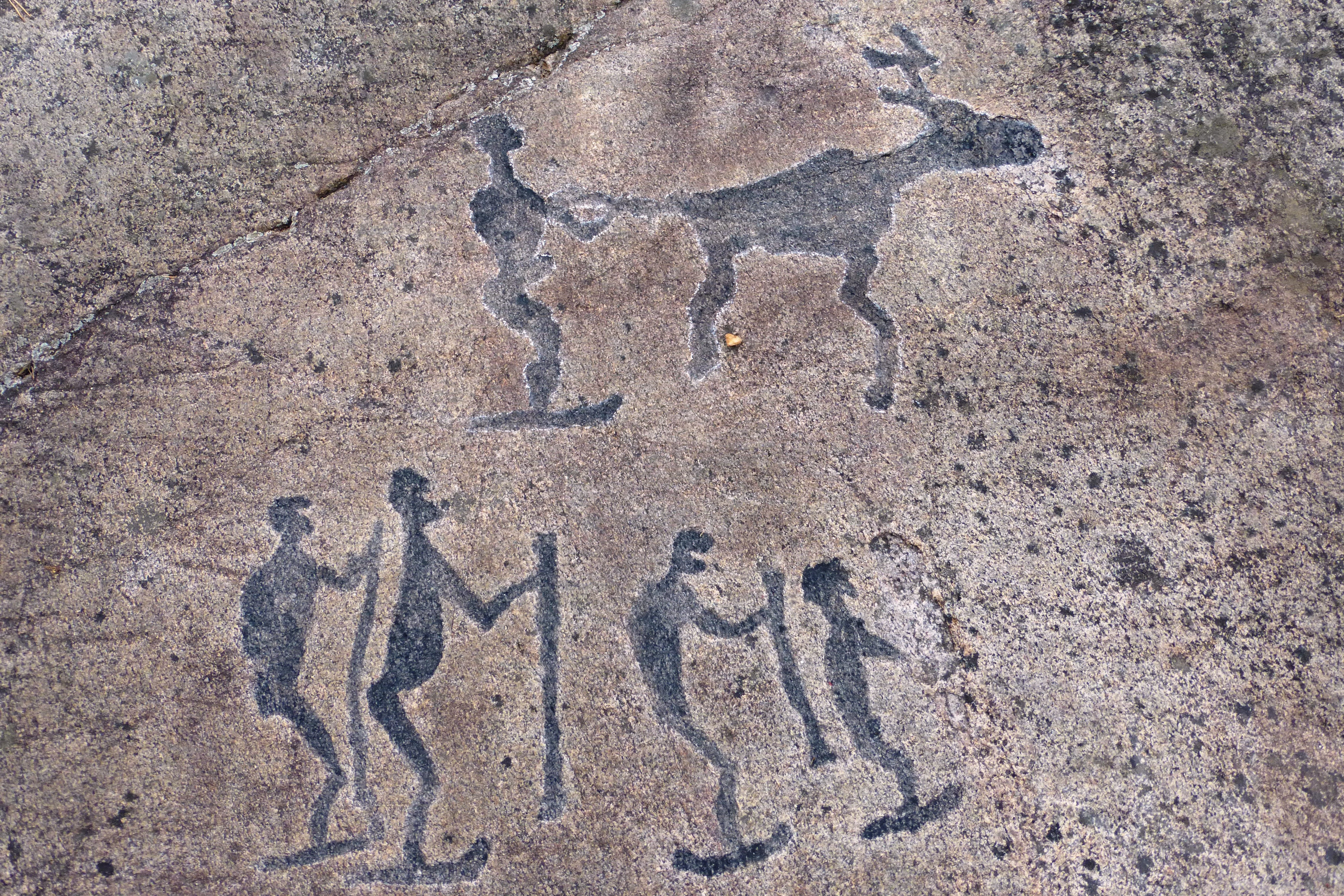
A Karelian Petroglyph depicting 5 skiers and a reindeer. These petroglyphs date to 7,000~6,000 years BP.

== Material culture ==
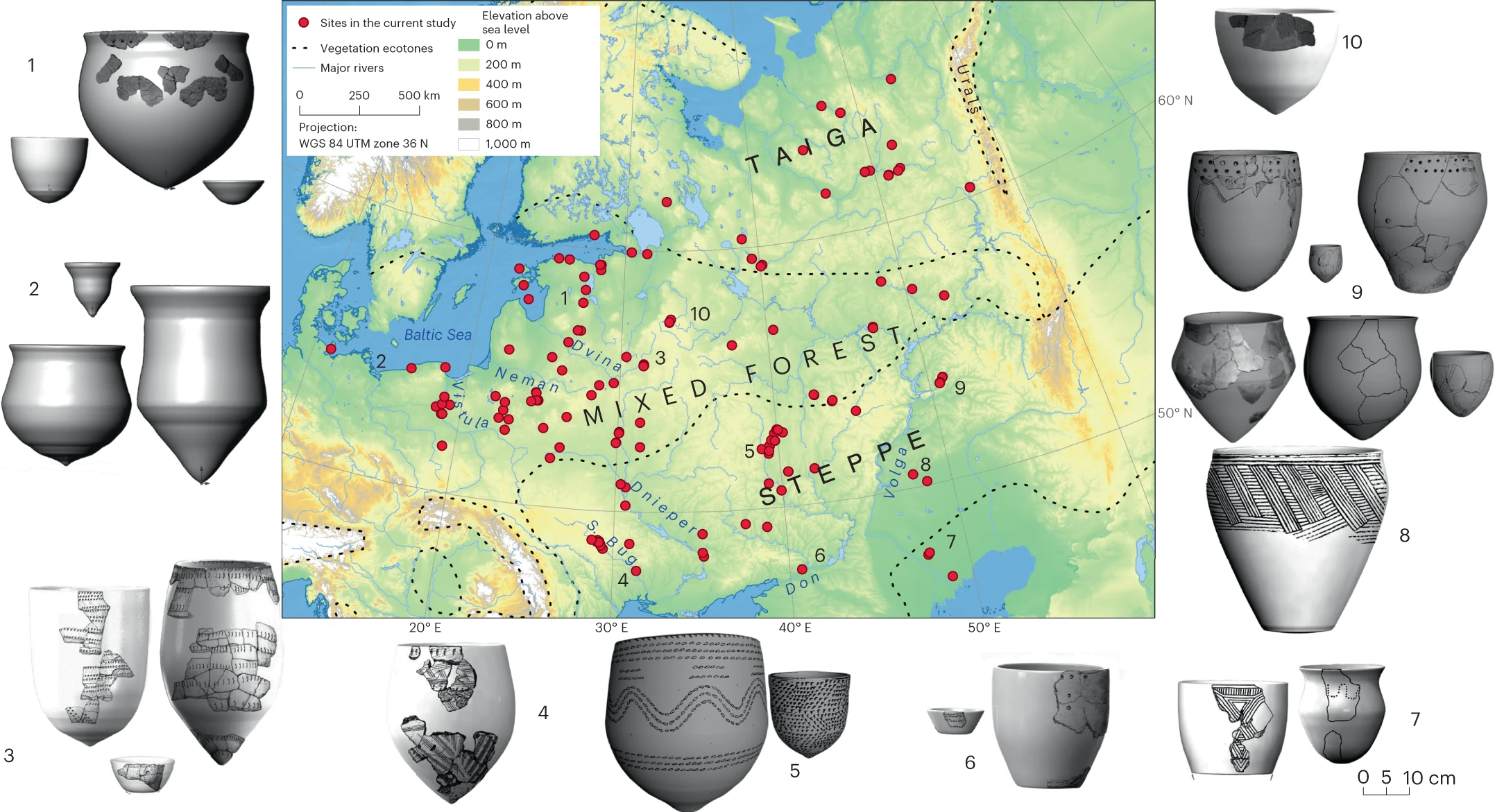
A map of the adoption of pottery among Eastern European hunter-gatherers, during the 6th millennium BCE. From the first adoption circa 5900 BCE in the North Caspian Sea -or possibly from beyond the Urals area-, to a final diffusion circa 5500 BCE in the Baltic.

As hunter-gatherers, the EHGs initially relied upon stone tools and artifacts that were derived from ivory, horns, or antlers. From circa 5,900 BCE, they started to adopt pottery in the area of the northern Caspian Sea, or possibly from east of the Ural Mountains.

In barely three or four centuries, pottery spread over a distance of about 3,000 kilometers, reaching as far as the Baltic Sea. This technological spread was much faster than the spread of agriculture itself, and mainly occurred through technology transfer between hunter-gatherer groups, rather than through the demic diffusion of agriculturalists.

== See also ==
- Dnieper-Donets culture
- Comb Ceramic culture
- Sredny Stog culture
- Deriivka
- Samara culture
- Khvalynsk culture

== Bibliography ==
- Anthony, David (Spring–Summer 2019a). "Archaeology, Genetics, and Language in the Steppes: A Comment on Bomhard". Journal of Indo-European Studies. 47 (1–2).
- Anthony, David W. (2019b). "Ancient DNA, Mating Networks, and the Anatolian Split". In Serangeli, Matilde; Olander, Thomas (eds.). Dispersals and Diversification: Linguistic and Archaeological Perspectives on the Early Stages of Indo-European. BRILL. pp. 21–54. ISBN 978-90-04-41619-2.
- Günther, Thorsten (January 1, 2018). "Population genomics of Mesolithic Scandinavia: Investigating early postglacial migration routes and high-latitude adaptation". PLOS Biology. 16 (1) e2003703. PLOS. doi:10.1371/journal.pbio.2003703. PMC 5760011. PMID 29315301.
- Haak, Wolfgang (June 11, 2015). "Massive migration from the steppe was a source for Indo-European languages in Europe". Nature. 522 (7555): 207–211. arXiv:1502.02783. Bibcode:2015Natur.522..207H. doi:10.1038/nature14317. PMC 5048219. PMID 25731166.
- Jones, Eppie R. (February 20, 2017). "The Neolithic Transition in the Baltic Was Not Driven by Admixture with Early European Farmers". Current Biology. 27 (4). Cell Press: 576–582. Bibcode:2017CBio...27..576J. doi:10.1016/j.cub.2016.12.060. PMC 5321670. PMID 28162894.
- Kashuba, Natalija (May 15, 2019). "Ancient DNA from mastics solidifies connection between material culture and genetics of mesolithic hunter–gatherers in Scandinavia". Communications Biology. 2 (105). Nature Research: 185. doi:10.1038/s42003-019-0399-1. PMC 6520363. PMID 31123709.
- Lazaridis, Iosif (July 25, 2016). "Genomic insights into the origin of farming in the ancient Near East". Nature. 536 (7617): 419–424. Bibcode:2016Natur.536..419L. doi:10.1038/nature19310. PMC 5003663. PMID 27459054.
- Mathieson, Iain (November 23, 2015). "Genome-wide patterns of selection in 230 ancient Eurasians". Nature. 528 (7583): 499–503. Bibcode:2015Natur.528..499M. doi:10.1038/nature16152. PMC 4918750. PMID 26595274.
- Mathieson, Iain; Alpaslan-Roodenberg, Songül; Posth, Cosimo; Szécsényi-Nagy, Anna; et al. (March 2018). "The genomic history of southeastern Europe". Nature. 555 (7695): 197–203. Bibcode:2018Natur.555..197M. doi:10.1038/nature25778. PMC 6091220. PMID 29466330.
- Mittnik, Alisa (January 30, 2018). "The genetic prehistory of the Baltic Sea region". Nature Communications. 16 (1): 442. Bibcode:2018NatCo...9..442M. doi:10.1038/s41467-018-02825-9. PMC 5789860. PMID 29382937.
- Narasimhan, Vagheesh M. (September 6, 2019). "The formation of human populations in South and Central Asia". Science. 365 (6457) eaat7487. American Association for the Advancement of Science. bioRxiv 10.1101/292581. doi:10.1126/science.aat7487. PMC 6822619. PMID 31488661.
- Saag, Lehti (July 24, 2017). "Extensive Farming in Estonia Started through a Sex-Biased Migration from the Steppe". Current Biology. 27 (14). Cell Press: 2185–2193. Bibcode:2017CBio...27E2185S. doi:10.1016/j.cub.2017.06.022. PMID 28712569.
- Wang, Chuan-Chao (February 4, 2019). "Ancient human genome-wide data from a 3000-year interval in the Caucasus corresponds with eco-geographic regions Eurasia". Nature Communications. 10 (1): 590. Bibcode:2019NatCo..10..590W. doi:10.1038/s41467-018-08220-8. PMC 6360191. PMID 30713341.
