= Yuzhny Oleny =

Archaeological site

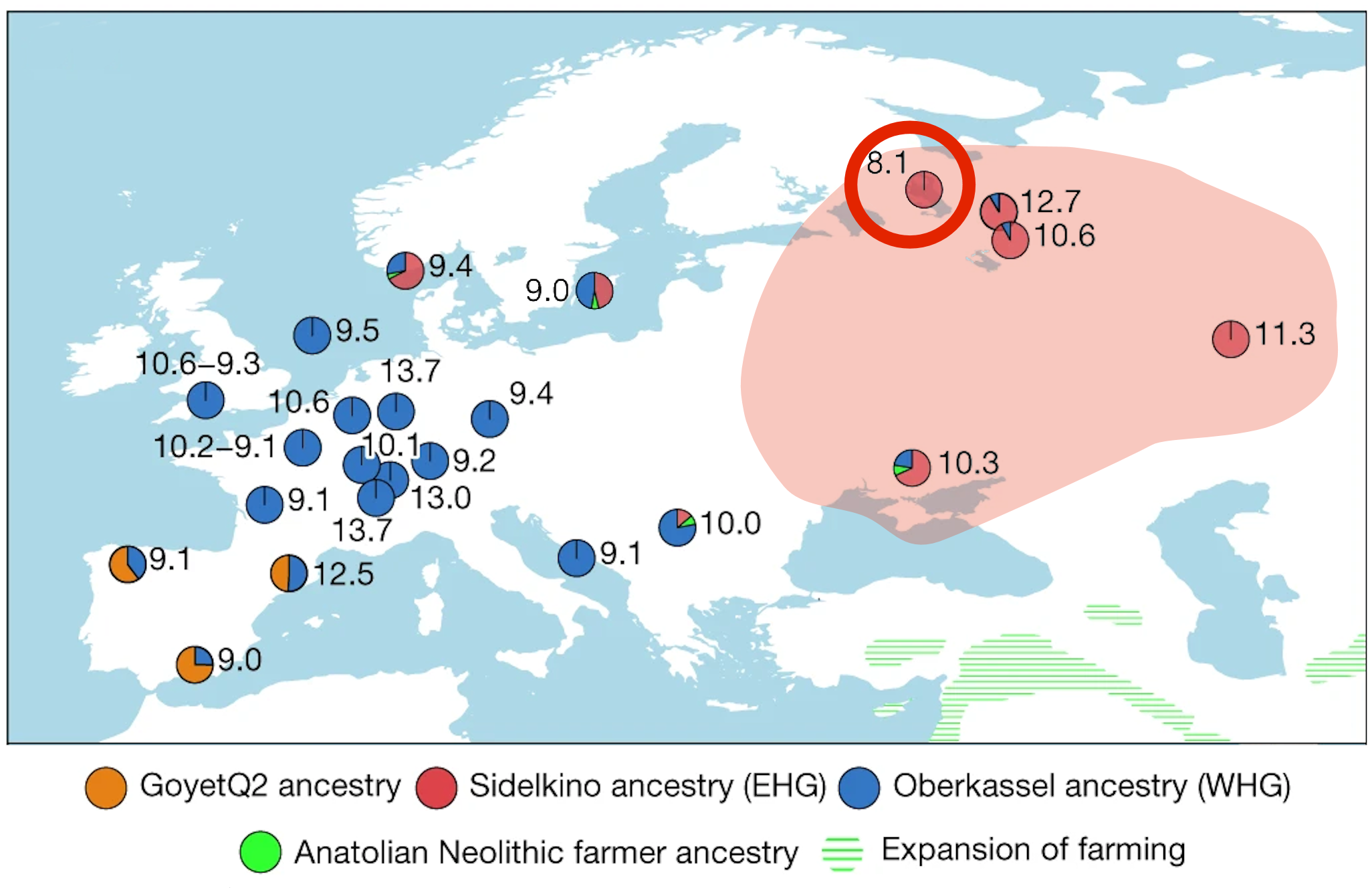
- Hunter-gatherer populations, with their specific ancestries, between 14 ka and 9 ka. The area of the Eastern Hunter-Gatherer (EHG) appears in pink, with the site of Yuzhny Oleny (red circle)

- Location of Yuzhny Oleny.
- 62.050022°N 35.358273°E
- Type: Burial site
- Periods: Late Upper Paleolithic to Mesolithic
- Location: Karelia, Russia

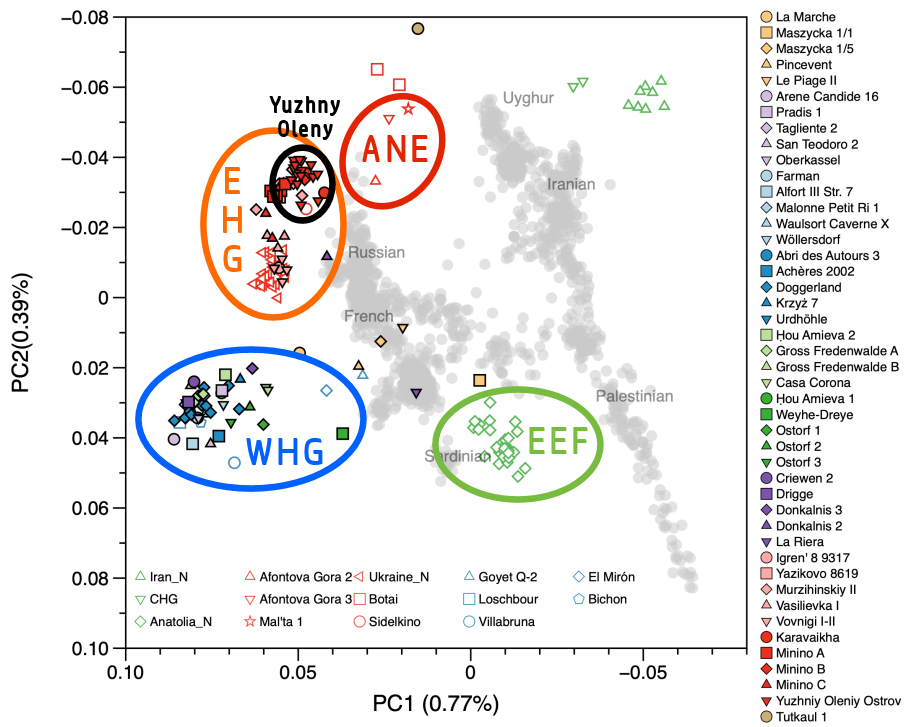
The Yuzhny Oleny population (black circle) was most closely related to the Ancient North Eurasians (ANE, red circle)

Yuzhny Oleny ("Southern Reindeer"), also Yuzhniy Oleniy, is an archaeological site located on Yuzhny Oleny island (Russian: Южный Олений остров, romanized: Yuzhniy Oleniy ostrov), in Lake Onega, Karelia.

Remains of Eastern Hunter-Gatherers dated to circa 8,100 BP (6,100 BCE) have been excavated at Yuzhny Oleny. A total of 19 Eastern Hunter-Gatherer genomes were extracted from Yuzhny Oleny, which had comparable or lower WHG ancestry compared to other EHG groups. The Ancient North Eurasian (ANE) ancestry is the main component of the Yuzhny Oleny group, and is particularly high among them compared to the rest of the Eastern Hunter-Gatherers (EHG). The 11 ka Sidelkino individual from Samara in western Russia also had a virtually identical profile with the members of the Yuzhniy Oleniy group. The genes of the Yuzhny Oleni were transmitted to the people of the Yamnaya Culture, and to Scandinavia through a western route.

A genetic study published in Nature in March 2023 examined the remains of fifteen individuals discovered in a burial site at Yuzhny Oleny, dating back to approximately 8,200 years ago. The nine samples of Y-DNA extracted belonged to haplogroup Q1a1-F746/NWT01 (three samples), Q1b1-L53, R1a2-YP4141, R1a-M420, R1-M173, and J1-L255 (two samples). The fifteen samples of mtDNA extracted belonged to haplogroup U4 (three samples), U2e1 (three samples), U5a1 (two samples), and R1b (three samples), U4a2, U2e1e, U5a2, and U5a2d.

The Eastern Hunter-Gatherer people established themselves in Karelia soon after the retreat of the ice sheet, circa 10,000 years before present (BP). The first implements were made of stone, but ceramics were introduced circa 5,000 BCE.

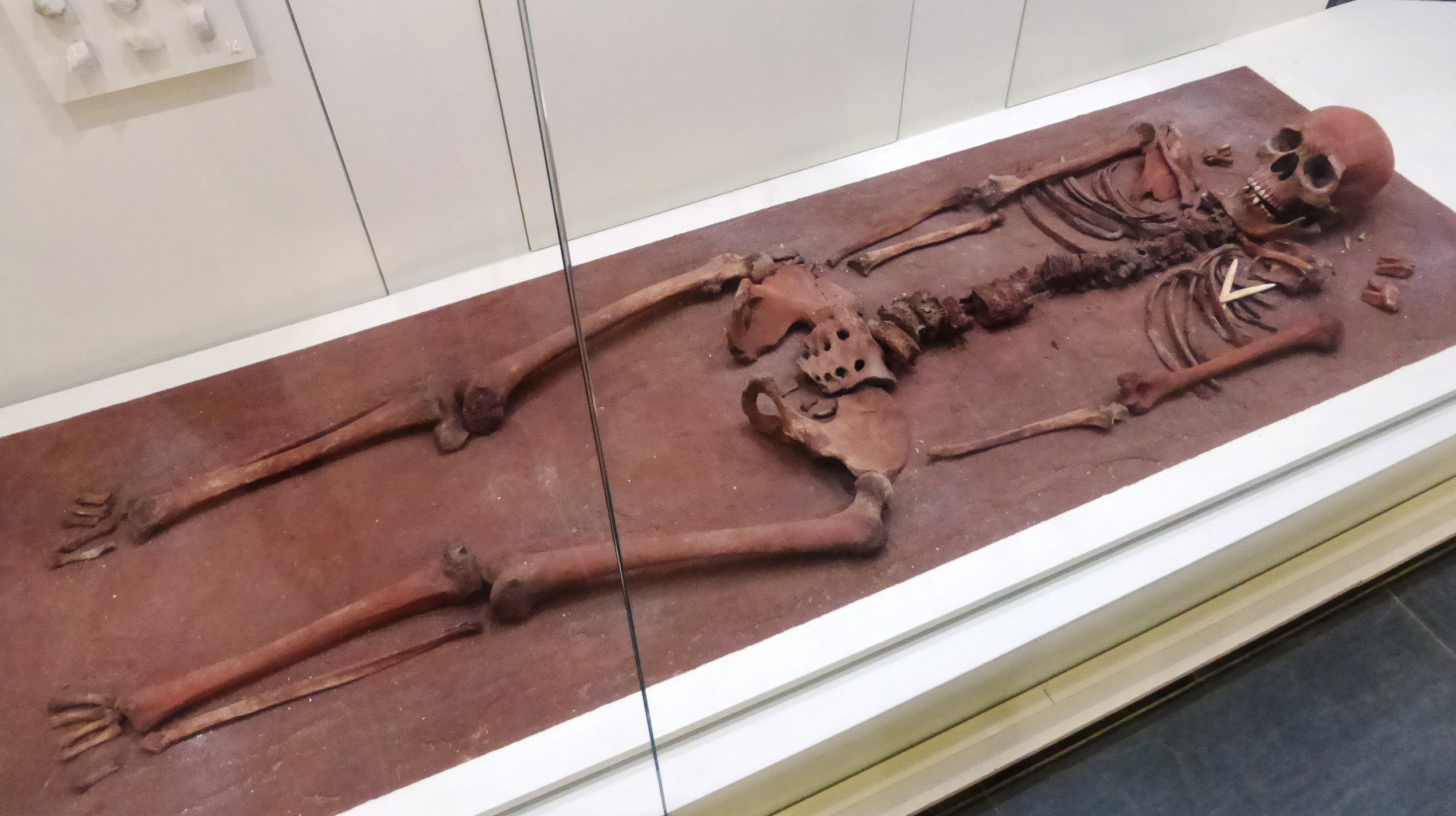
Reconstruction of burial No. 132 of the Oleneostrovsky burial ground (Yuzhni Oleny island, Lake Onega). Exhibit of the National Museum of the Republic of Karelia.

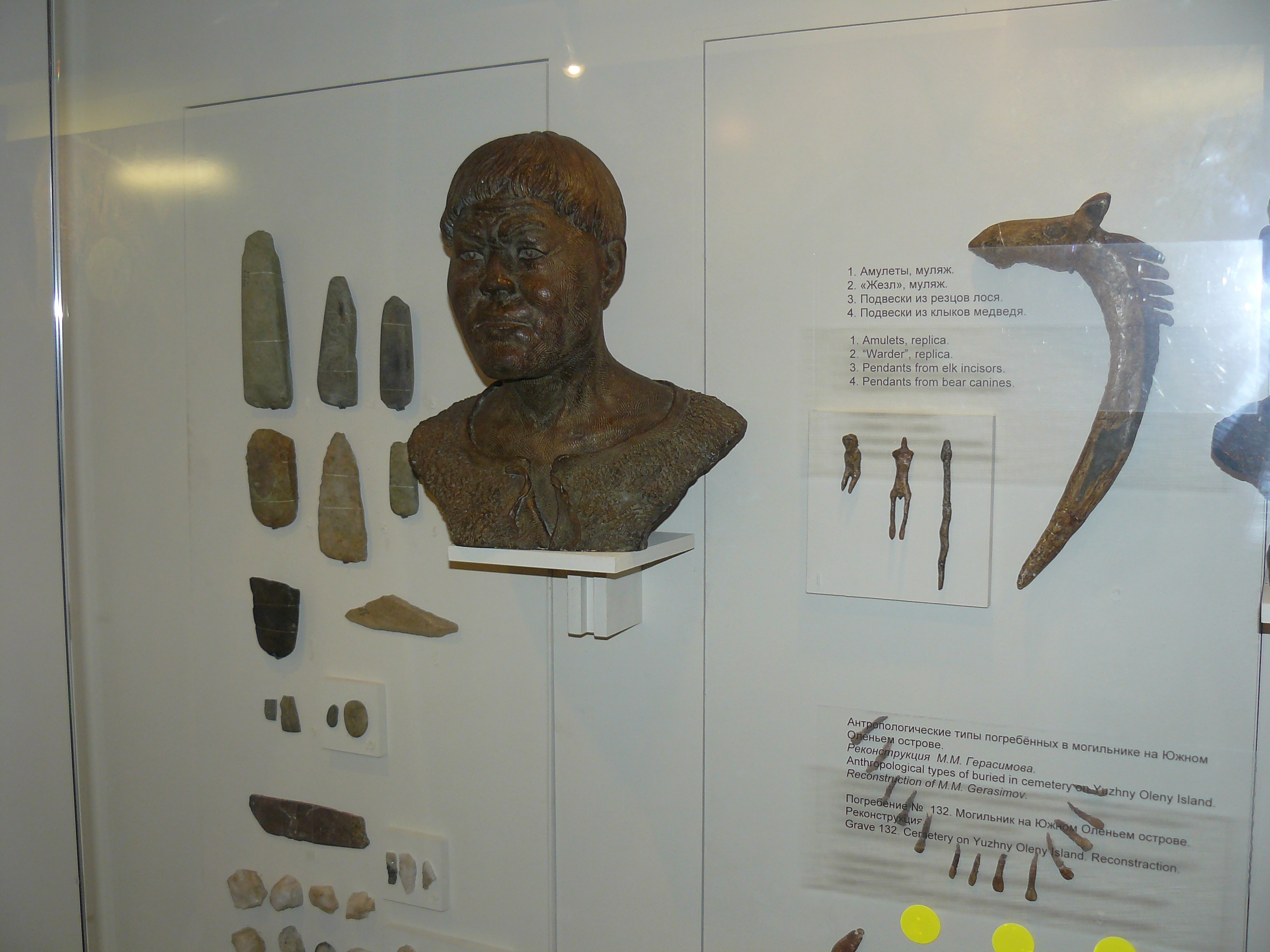
Artifacts and reconstruction of the deceased (by Gerasimov) in tomb No. 132 from Yuzhni Oleny island.

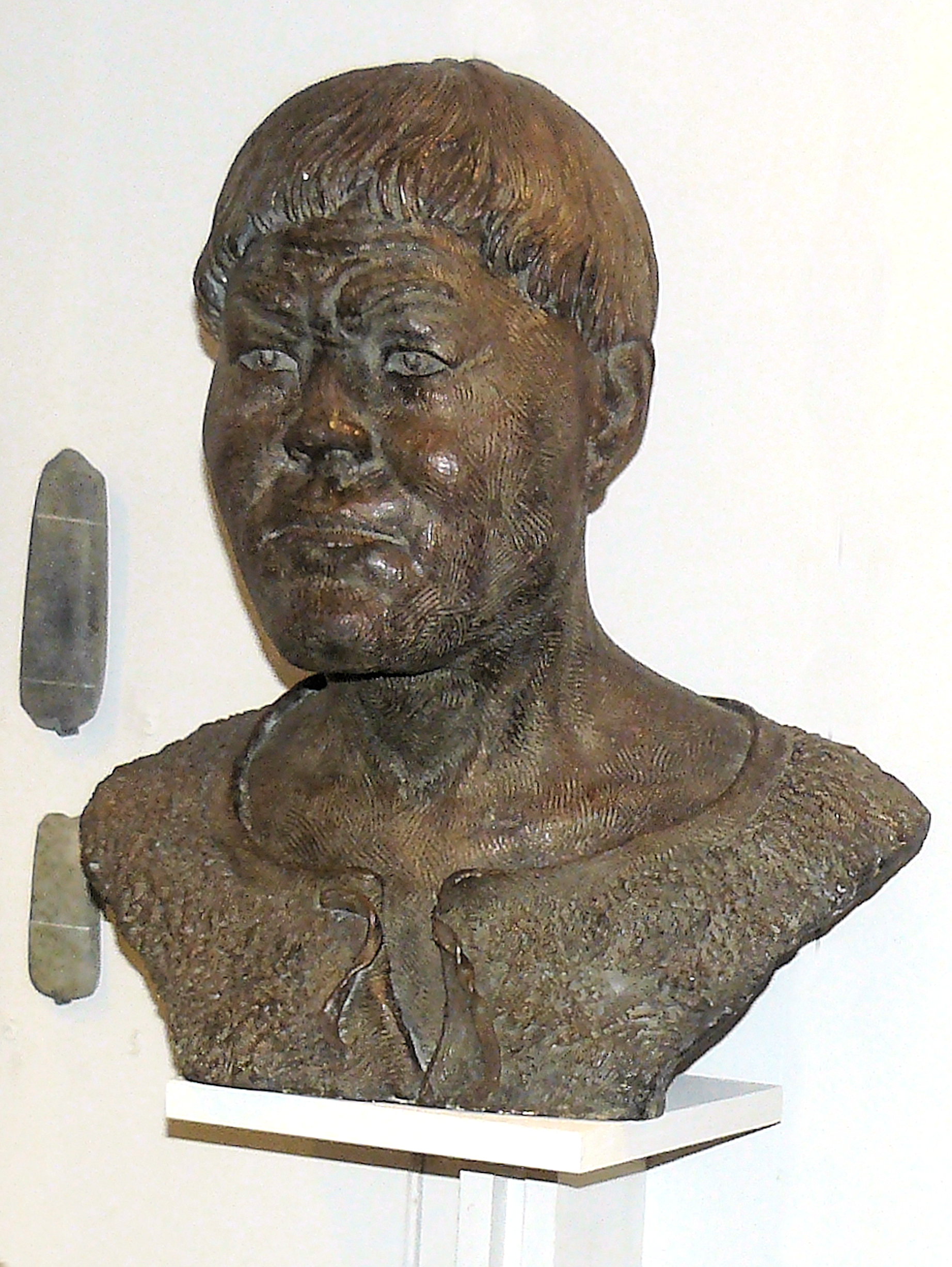
Forensic reconstruction by Gerasimov of individual in tomb No. 132 in Yuzhi Oleny island
