= Haplogroup I-M170 =

Human Y-chromosome DNA haplogroup

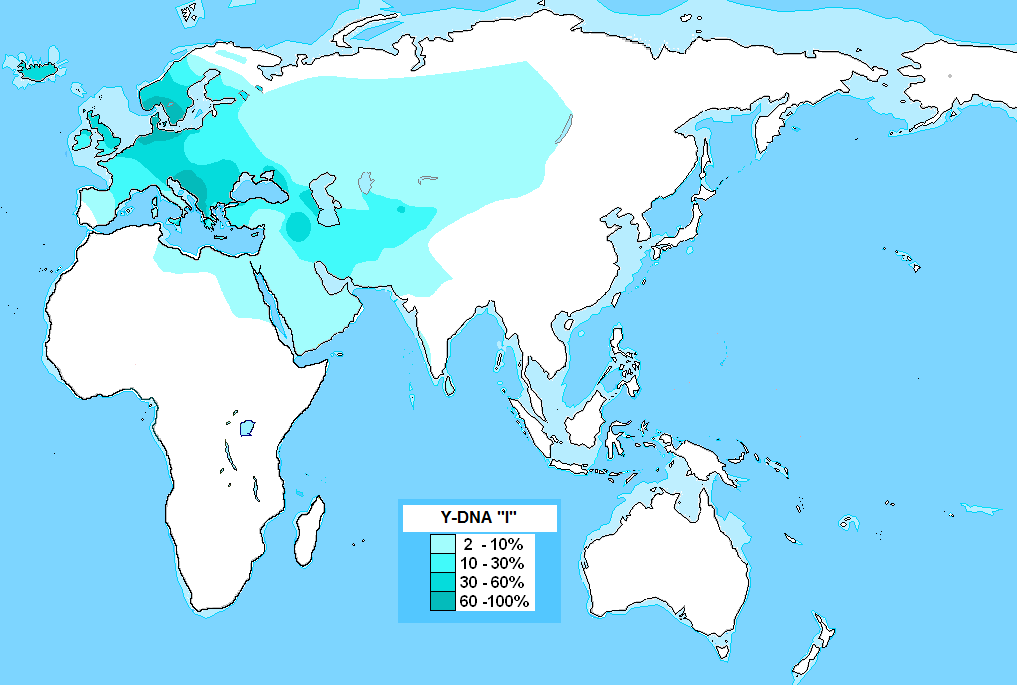
- Possible time of origin: ~42,900 Years BP
- Coalescence age: ~27,500 Years BP
- Possible place of origin: Gravettian, Europe; Possibly originally Cro-Magnon, Europe
- Ancestor: IJ
- Descendants: I*, I1, I2
- Defining mutations: L41, M170, M258, P19_1, P19_2, P19_3, P19_4, P19_5, P38, P212, U179

Haplogroup I (M170) is a Y-chromosome DNA haplogroup. It is a subgroup of haplogroup IJ, which itself is a derivative of the haplogroup IJK. Subclades I1 and I2 can be found in most present-day European populations, with peaks in some Northern European and Southeastern European countries.

Haplogroup I most likely arose in Europe, with it so far found in Palaeolithic sites throughout Europe, but not outside it. It diverged from common ancestor IJ* about 43,000 years ago. Early evidence for haplogroup J has been found in the Caucasus and Iran. In addition, living examples of the precursor Haplogroup IJ* have been found only in Iran, among the Mazandarani and ethnic Persians from Fars. This may indicate that IJ originated in South West Asia.

The oldest example found was originally that of Paglicci133 from Italy, which is at least 31,000 years old, however, in a later study this was changed, and instead Dolní Věstonice (DV14) from the Czech Republic was reported as the oldest, being at least 30,800 years old.

Haplogroup I has been found in multiple individuals belonging to the Gravettian culture. The Gravettians expanded westwards from the far corner of Eastern Europe, likely Russia, to Central Europe. They are associated with a genetic cluster that is normally called the Věstonice cluster.

== Origins ==
Spread of Cro-Magnons

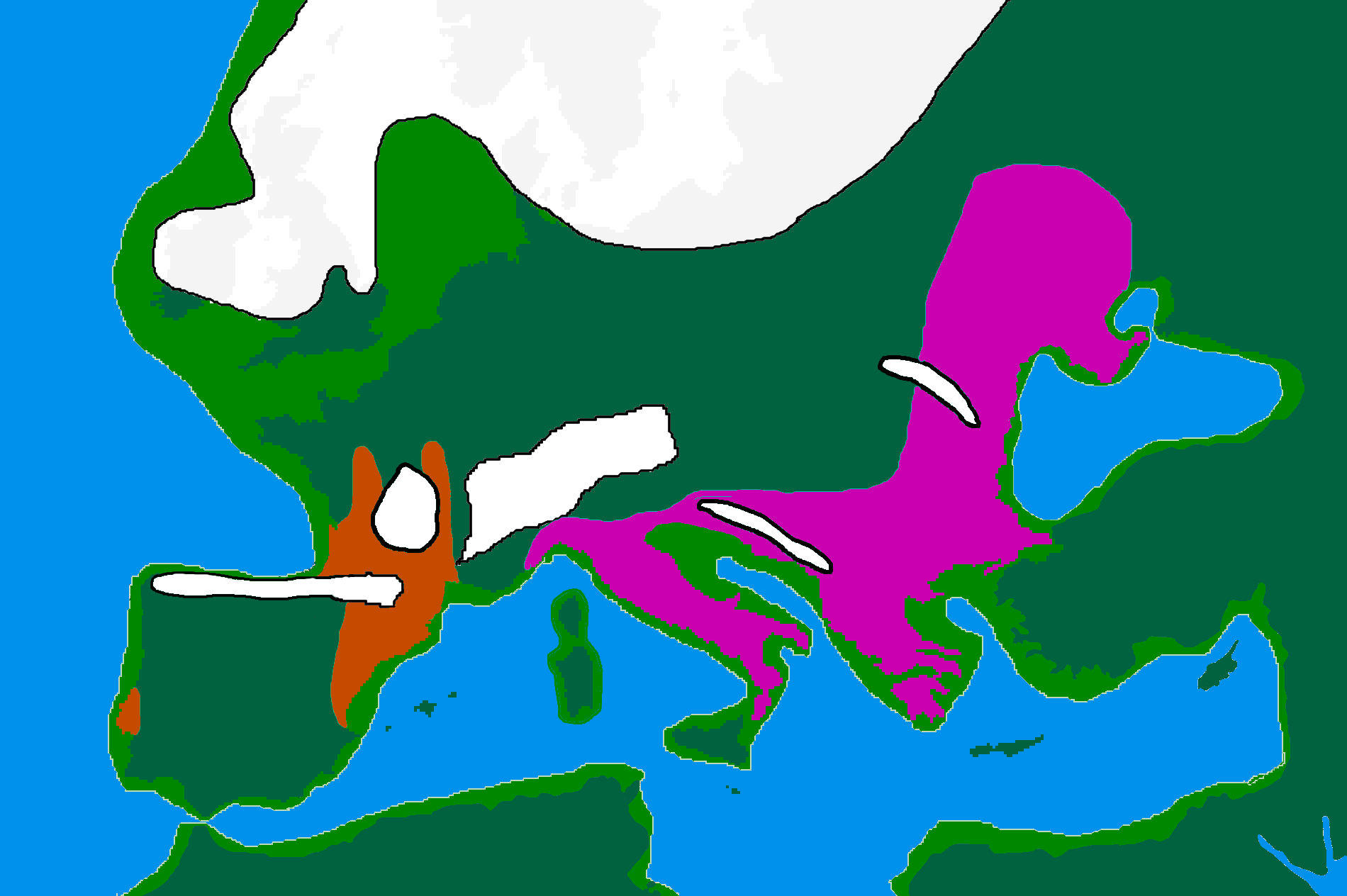
European LGM refuges, 20,000 years BP. Solutrean and Proto-Solutrean Cultures Epi-Gravettian Culture

Available evidence suggests that I-M170 was preceded into areas in which it would later become dominant by haplogroups K2a (K-M2308) and C1 (Haplogroup C-F3393). K2a and C1 have been found in the oldest sequenced male remains from Western Eurasia (dating from circa 45,000 to 35,000 years BP), such as: Ust'-Ishim man (modern west Siberia) K2a*, Oase 1 (Romania) K2a*, Kostenki 14 (south west Russia) C1b, and Goyet Q116-1 (Belgium) C1a. The oldest I-M170 found is that of an individual known as Krems WA3 (lower Austria), dating from circa 33,000-24,000 BP. At the same site, two twin boys were also found, both were assigned to haplogroup I*.

Haplogroup IJ was in the Middle East and/or Europe about 40,000 years ago. The TMRCA (time to most recent common ancestor) for I-M170 was estimated by Karafet and colleagues in 2008 to be 22,200 years ago, with a confidence interval between 15,300 and 30,000 years ago. This would make the founding event of I-M170 approximately contemporaneous with the Last Glacial Maximum (LGM), which lasted from 26,500 years ago until approximately 19,500 years ago. TMRCA is an estimate of the time of subclade divergence. Rootsi and colleagues in 2004 also note two other dates for a clade, age of STR variation, and time since population divergence. These last two dates are roughly associated, and occur somewhat after subclade divergence. For Haplogroup I-M170 they estimate time to STR variation as 24,000 ±7,100 years ago and time to population divergence as 23,000 ±7,700 years ago. These estimates are consistent with those of Karafet 2008 cited above. However, Underhill and his colleagues calculate the time to subclade divergence of I1 and I2 to be 28,400 ±5,100 years ago, although they calculate the STR variation age of I1 at only 8,100 ±1,500 years ago.

Semino (2000) speculated that the initial dispersion of this population corresponds to the diffusion of the Gravettian culture. Later the haplogroup, along with two cases of Haplogroup C, was found in human remains belonging to the previously mentioned Gravettian culture and in individuals of the Magdalenian and Azilian cultures. Rootsi and colleagues in 2004 suggested that each of the ancestral populations now dominated by a particular subclade of Haplogroup I-M170 experienced an independent population expansion immediately after the Last Glacial Maximum.

The five known cases of Haplogroup I from Upper Paleolithic European human remains make it one of the most frequent haplogroup from that period. In 2016, the 31,210–34,580-year-old remains of a hunter-gatherer from Paglicci Cave, Apulia, Italy were found to carry I-M170. So far, only Haplogroup F* and Haplogroup C1b have been documented, once each, on older remains in Europe. I2 subclade of I-M170 is the main haplogroup found on male remains in Mesolithic Europe, until circa 6,000 BCE, when mass migration into Europe of Anatolian farmers carrying Y-DNA G2a happened.

Due to the arrival of so-called Early European Farmers (EEFs), I-M170 is outnumbered by Haplogroup G among Neolithic European remains and by Haplogroup R in later remains.

The earliest documentation of I1 is from Neolithic Hungary, although it must have separated from I2 at an earlier point in time.

In one instance, haplogroup I was found far from Europe, among 2,000-year-old remains from Mongolia.

It would seem to be that separate waves of population movement impacted Southeastern Europe. The role of the Balkans as a long-standing corridor to Europe from Anatolia and/or the Caucasus is shown by the common phylogenetic origins of both haplogroups I and J in the parent haplogroup IJ (M429). This common ancestry suggests that the subclades of IJ entered the Balkans from Anatolia or the Caucasus, some time before the Last Glacial Maximum. I and J were subsequently distributed in Asia and Europe in a disjunctive phylogeographic pattern typical of "sibling" haplogroups. A natural geographical corridor like the Balkans is likely to have been used later by members of other subclades of IJ, as well as other haplogroups, including those associated with Early European Farmers.

The existence of Haplogroup IJK – the ancestor of both haplogroups IJ and K (M9) – and its evolutionary distance from other subclades of Haplogroup F (M89), supports the inference that haplogroups IJ and K both arose in Southwestern Asia. Living carriers of F* and IJ* have been reported from the Iranian Plateau.

== Distribution ==
Frequencies of Haplogroup I:

Population	% hg I	% hg I (Subpopulation)	Sampled individuals	Source
Abazinians	3.4		88	Sergeevich 2007
Abkhazians	33.3		12	Nasidze Ivan 2004
Adyghe (Adygea)	7		154	
Adyghe (Cherkessia)	2		126	Sergeevich 2007
Adyghe (Kabardia)	10		59	Nasidze Ivan 2004
Afghanistan		3 (Hazara people)	60	El Sibai 2009
Afghanistan	1.5%	3.3% (2/60) Hazara, 1.8% (1/56) Tajik	204	Haber et al. 2012
Afghanistan	0.99%	2.6% (2/77) Hazara, 2.1% (3/142) Tajiks, 0/74 Turkmens, 0/87 Pashtuns, 0/127 Uzbeks	507	Di Cristofaro 2013
Albanians		13% (29/223) (Albania)	223	Sarno 2015
Albanians		16 (Tosk), 4 (Gheg)		Ferri 2010
Albanians		21.82% (12/55) (Tirana)	55	Battaglia 2008
Albanians		7 (Tirana)	30	Bosch 2006
Algerians	0		156	
Andis	27			
Armenians	5			FTDNA 2013
Avars	2		115	Balanovsky
Austrians	28	50 (Vienna), 29 (Graz), 6 (Tyrol)		
Ashkenazi	1		1099	
Azeri	3		72	Nasidze Ivan 2004
Balkars	3		135	Kutuev 2007
Belarusians	23	11 (West), 15 (North), 16 (East), 28 (Centre), 30 (East Polesie), 34 (West Polesie)	565	Kushniarevich 2013
Belarusians	32	Polesie- 43 (Vichin), 12 (Avtyuki)	204	Sergeevich 2015
Bosnia and Herzegovina	53	73 (Croats), 49 (Bosniaks), 33 (Serbs)	256	Marjanovic 2006
Bosnia and Herzegovina	65	Herzegovina- 71 (Mostar, Siroki Brijeg), Bosnia- 54 (Zenica)	210	Pericic 2005
Bosnia and Herzegovina		73 (Croats), 45 (Bosniaks), 36 (Serbs)	255	Battaglia 2008
Bulgarians	27-29	40 (Varna), 32 (Sofia), 30 (Plovdiv), 10 (Haskovo)	935	Karachanak 2009–13
Bulgarians	34		100	Begona Martinez-Cruz 2012
Bulgaria		19 (Bulgarian Turks)	63	Zaharova 2002
Central Asia	2		984	Rootsi 2004
Chechens	0		330	Balanovsky
Croats	45		1100	Mrsic 2012
Croats	47	55 (Hvar), 52 (Osijek), 41 (Pula), 57 (Split), 29 (Varaždin)	518	Primorac 2022
Cyprus	1		164	El-Sibai 2009
Czechs	18	25 (Klatovy), 25 (Písek), 15 (Brno) 14 (Hradec Králové), 10 (Třebíč)	257	Luca 2007
Danes	49		194	Rootsi 2004
Darginians	58		26	Nasidze Ivan 2004
Darginians (Kaitak)	0		101	
Dutch	27.8		2085	Altena 2020
Dutch	33		410	Van Doorn 2008
Egyptians	0		124	El-Sibai 2009
Egyptians	1		370	
Estonians	19		194	Rootsi 2004
English	18		945	Rootsi 2004
English	26	12 (Cornwall), 38 (Essex)	1830	FTDNA 2016
Estonians	17		118	Lappalainen 2008
Flemish Belgians	28		113	
Finland	29	36 (Swedes from Ostrobothnia), 15 (Northern Savo)	536	Lappalainen 2006
French		16 (South), 24 (Normandy), 4 (Lyon), 4 (Corsica)		Rootsi 2004
French	9	5 (Auvergne), 13 (Brittany), 9 (Nord Pas de Calais)	555	Ramos-Luis 2009
French	13	11 (Paris), 18 (Strasburg), 10 (Lyon)	333	Kari Hauhio
Gagauzes	28		89	Varzari 2006
Georgians	0		63	Rootsi 2004
Georgians	4		77	Nasidze Ivan 2004
Germans	24	32 (Berlin), 32 (Hamburg), 15 (Leipzig)	1215	Kayser 2005
Greeks	14	30 (Macedonia)	261	Rootsi 2004
Greeks		10 (Athens), 30 (Macedonia)	149	Battaglia 2008
Greeks		36 (Serres), 24 (Agrinio), 20 (Thessaloniki), 18 (Mytilene), 14 (Crete), 14 (Larissa), 11 (Patrai), 12 (Karditsa), 8 (Ioannina), 2 (Chios)	366	Di Giacommo 2003
Greeks		12 (North), 24 (South)	142	Zalloua 2008
Greenlanders	17		215	Sanchez 2004
Hungarians	23		162	Rootsi 2004
Hungarians	28		230	Vago Zalan Andrea 2008
Indians		0 (North India)	560	
Ingush	0		143	
Iranians	2	22 (South Iran), 5 (Khorasan), 0 (Teheran)	186	Di Cristofaro 2013
Iranians		1 (West), 1 (East)	324	
Iranians	0		83	Rootsi 2004
Iranians	1		92	El-Sibai 2009
Iranians	0	6 (Armenians of Teheran), 0 (Persians of Teheran, Fars, Isfahan, Khorasan, Yazd)	952	Grugni 2012
Iraqis	1		176	Rootsi 2004
Iraqis	1		117	El-Sibai 2009
Irish	11		76	Rootsi 2004
Irish	10		119	Cappeli 2013
Irish		11 (Rush, County Dublin)		Capelli 2003
Italians		5 (North), 7 (Central), 9 (South and Sicily), 39 (Sardinia)		Rootsi 2004
Italians	10	31 (Sardinia), 4 (Umbria, Marche)	884	Boattini 2013
Italians	7	0 (Calabria, Pescara, Garfagnana, Val di Non), 5 (Verona), 7(Genoa), 19 (Foggia)	524	Di Giacomo 2003
Italians		36 (Filettino) 35 (Cappadocia, Abruzzo), 28 (Vallepietra)		Messina 2015
Italians		23 (Udine), 17 (Saniti), 13 (Picentes), 7 (Latini)	583	Brisighelli 2012
Italians		30 (Stelvio)		
Italians		31 (Caccamo)		Gaetano 2008
Jordanians	1		273	El-Sibai 2009
Jordanians		5 (Amman), 0 (Dead Sea)	146	Flores 2005
Kara Nogays	13		76	
Karachays	9		69	Sergeevich 2007
Kazakhs	1		370	
Kosovar Albanians	8		114	Pericic 2005
Kumyks	0		73	Kutuev 2007
Kurds		4 (West Iran)	21	Malyarchuk 2013
Kurds		2 (Iran)	59	Gragni 2012
Kurmanji		17 (Turkey), 0 (Georgia)	112	Nasidze 2005
Kuwaiti	0		42	El-Sibai 2009
Kyrgyzstan		0 (Uyghurs), 0 (Kyrgyz)		Di Cristofaro 2013
Laks	14			
Latvians	9	3 (Southwest)		
Lebanese	3	10 (North Maronite), 0 (Shia)	951	
Lebanese	5		66	Rootsi 2004
Lezgis	0		81	
Lithuanians	7			Kushniarevich 2015
Libyans	0		83	
Libyans	2	1	175	Fendri 2015
Macedonians		34 (Skopje)	79	Pericic 2005
Macedonians	24	31 (Macedonians), 12 (Albanians)	343	Noevski 2010
Macedonians		13 (Albanians)	64	Battaglia 2008
Maltese	12		90	El-Sibai 2009
Moldovans		29 (Moldovans), 25 (Ukrainians)		Varzari 2006
Moroccans	0		316	El-Sibai 2009
Moroccans	0		760	
Mongols	1		160	Di Cristofaro 2013
Norwegians	37	40 (Oslo) 30 (West), 42 (East, South), 35 (North), 33 (Bergen)		Dupuy 2005
Pakistan	0		638	
Poles	17	19 (Warsaw), 12 (Lublin), 22 (Szczecin)	913	Kayser 2005
Poles	18		191	Rootsi 2004
Portuguese	5		303	Rootsi 2004
Portuguese	8	3 (Lisbon), 0 (Setúbal), 18 (Braga)	657	Beleza 2005
Qatar	0		72	El-Sibai 2009
Romani		17 (Hungary), 10 (Tiszavasvari), 5 (Tokaj) 37 (Taktakoz), 11 (Slovakia)		Vago Zalan Andrea 2008
Romanians	28	36 (Brasov), 18 (Cluj)	178	Martinez-Cruz 2012
Romanians	22		361	Rootsi 2004
Russians		13 (North Europe), 18 (Centre Europe), 21 (South Europe), 27 (Unzha), 0 (Mezen)	1228	Balanovsky 2008
Russia		2 (Udmurts), 5 (Pinega), 5 (Komi), 5 (Tatars), 6 (Bashkortostan), 7 (Chuvashes), 19 (Kostroma), 11 (Smolensk), 17 (Belgorod), 19 (Mordvins), 23 (Cossacks), 24 (Adygea)		Rootsi 2004
Saami	31			Rootsi 2004
Saudis	0		1597	
Scotland	11	17 (Scottish Isles)		Rootsi 2004
Sephardi		4 (Portugal)	57	
Serbs	39	Serbia with Kosovo	209	Zgonjanin 209
Serbs		48 (Serbia), 39 (Kosovo), 52 (Herzegovina and Montenegro)	1200	Mihajlovic 2022
Slovaks	28		250	Petrejcikova 2013
Slovenians	30	57 (Spodnjeposavska)	458	Vakar 2010
Spaniards	6	18 (Asturias), 0 (Gascony)	1002	Adams 2008
Sudanese		5 (Nubians), 4 (Gaalien), 7 (Mesereia)		
Swedes	42	32 (Ostergotaland & Jonkoping) 50 (Gotland & Varmland)	305	Karlsson2006
Swedes		26 (North Sweden),		Rootsi2004
Swedes		41 (South), 26 (North)		Rootsi 2004
Swedes	44	60 (Kristianstad), 60 (Kalmar), 59 (Kronoberg), 55 (Stockholm), 37 (North Norrland), 52 (South Norrland)	1800	FTDNA 2016
Swiss	8		144	Rootsi 2004
Swiss	23	13 (Lausanne), 32 (Bern)		
Syrians		2 (West), 3 (East)	520	
Syrians	2		554	El Sibai 2009
Tataers		33 (China)	33	
Tunisians	0			El-Sibai 2009
Tunisians	0		601	
Turks	5	12 (Marmara), 10 (Istanbul), 7 (Western Anatolia), 4 (Central Anatolia), 0 (Eastern Anatolia)	523	Cinnioglu 2003
Turks	5		741	Rootsi 2004
UAE	0		164	El-Sibai 2009
Ukrainians	22		585	Rootsi 2004
Ukrainians	28	33 (Sumy), 23 (Ivano-Frankivsk)	701	Kushniarevich 2013
Welsh	8		196	Rootsi 2004
Yemenese	0		62	El-Sibai 2009
Zazas		33 (Turkey)	27	Nasidze 2005
		17 (Albanians in Tirana), 29 (Macedonians in Skopje), 21 (Aromanians in Krusevo), 19 (Greeks in Thrace), 42 (Aromanians in Andon Poci), 42 (Romanians in Constanta), 39 (Romanians in Piteşti)		Bosch 2006
		47 (Romanians from Buhusi and Piatra Neamț), 35 (Moldovans from Sofia), 24 (Moldovans from Karasahani) 24 (Gagauzes from Etulia), 31 (Gagauzes from Kongaz), 25 (Ukrainians from Rashkovo)		Vazari 2006
		38 (Sweden), 41 (Western Finland), 28 (Eastern Finland), 18 (Karelia), 12 (Lithuania), 7 (Latvia), 17 (Estonia)		Lappalainen2008
		34 (Iranians from Teheran), 10 (Iranians from Isfahan), 32 (Ossetians from Ardon), 13 (Ossetians from Digora)		Nasidze Ivan. 2004
		3 (Tajiks) 3 (East Persians)		Malyarchuk 2013
		2 (Kizhi), 4 (Teleuts), 4 (Khakassians), 3 (Todjins), 2 (Evenks) 3 (Tofalars), 1 (Tuvinians)		

== Subgroups ==
The subclades of Haplogroup I-M170 with their defining mutations, as of 2011. Up-to-date phylogenetic trees listing all currently known subclades of I can be found at Y-Full and FamilyTreeDNA

- I-M170 ( L41, M170, M258, P19_1, P19_2, P19_3, P19_4, P19_5, P38, P212, Page123, U179) Middle East, Caucasus, Europe.
  - I-M253 Haplogroup I1 (L64, L75, L80, L81, L118, L121/S62, L123, L124/S64, L125/S65, L157, L186, L187, M253, M307.2/P203.2, M450/S109, P30, P40, S63, S66, S107, S108, S110, S111) Typical of populations of Scandinavia and Northwest Europe, with a moderate distribution throughout Eastern Europe In Anatolia at 1%
    - I1a DF29/S438
      - I1a1 CTS6364/Z2336
        - I1a1a M227
          - I1a1a1 M72
        - I1a1b L22/S142
          - I1a1b1 P109
          - I1a1b2 L205
          - I1a1b3 L287
            - I1a1b3a L258/S335
              - I1a1b3a1 L296
          - I1a1b4 L300/S241
          - I1a1b5 L813/Z719
      - I1a2 S244/Z58
        - I1a2a S246/Z59
          - I1a2a1 S337/Z60, S439/Z61, Z62
            - I1a2a1a Z140, Z141
              - I1a2a1a1 Z2535
                - I1a2a1a1a L338
              - I1a2a1a2 F2642
            - I1a2a1b Z73
            - I1a2a1c L573
            - I1a2a1d L1248
              - I1a2a1d1 L803
          - I1a2a2 Z382
        - I1a2b S296/Z138, Z139
          - I1a2b1 Z2541
      - I1a3 S243/Z63
        - I1a3a L1237
    - I1b Z131
  - I-M438 Haplogroup I2 L68/PF3781/S329, M438/P215/PF3853/S31
    - I2a L460/PF3647/S238
      - I2a1 P37.2
        - I2a1a L158/PF4073/S433, L159.1/S169.1, M26/PF4056
          - I2a1a1 L160/PF4013
        - I2a1b L178/S328, M423
          - I2a1b1 L161.1/S185
          - I2a1b2 L621/S392
            - I2a1b2a1a L147.2
        - I2a1c L233/S183
      - I2a2 L35/PF3862/S150, L37/PF6900/S153, L181, M436/P214/PF3856/S33, P216/PF3855/S30, P217/PF3854/S23, P218/S32
        - I2a2a L34/PF3857/S151, L36/S152, L59, L368, L622, M223, P219/PF3859/S24, P220/S119, P221/PF3858/S120, P222/PF3861/U250/S118, P223/PF3860/S117, Z77
          - I2a2a1 CTS616, CTS9183
            - I2a2a1a M284
              - I2a2a1a1 L1195
                - I2a2a1a1a L126/S165, L137/S166, L369
                - I2a2a1a1b L1193
            - I2a2a1b L701, L702
              - I2a2a1b1 P78
              - I2a2a1b2 L699, L703
                - I2a2a1b2a L704
            - I2a2a1c Z161
              - I2a2a1c1 L801/S390
                - I2a2a1c1a CTS1977
                  - I2a2a1c1a1 P95
                - I2a2a1c1b CTS6433
                  - I2a2a1c1b1 Z78
                    - I2a2a1c1b1a L1198
                      - I2a2a1c1b1a1 Z190
                        - I2a2a1c1b1a1a S434/Z79
              - I2a2a1c2 L623, L147.4
            - I2a2a1d L1229
              - I2a2a1d1 Z2054
                - I2a2a1d1a L812/S391
              - I2a2a1d2 L1230
          - I2a2a2 L1228
        - I2a2b L38/S154, L39/S155, L40/S156, L65.1/S159.1, L272.3
          - I2a2b1 L533
    - I2b L415, L416, L417
    - I2c L596/PF6907/S292, L597/S333

Note that the naming of some of the subgroups has changed, as new markers have been identified, and the sequence of mutations has become clearer.

=== I-M170 ===
The composite subclade I-M170 contains individuals directly descended from the earliest members of Haplogroup I, bearing none of the subsequent mutations which identify the remaining named subclades.

Several I* individuals, who do not fall into any known subclades, have been found among the Lak people of Dagestan, at a rate of (3/21), as well as Turkey (8/741), Adygea in the Caucasus (2/138) and Iraq (1/176), even though I-M170 occurs at only very low frequencies among modern populations of these regions as a whole. This is consistent with the belief that the haplogroup first appeared in South West Eurasia.

There are also high frequencies of Haplogroup I* among the Andalusians (3/103), French (4/179), Slovenians (2/55), Tabassarans (1/30), and Saami (1/35).

(Neither study from which the above figures were drawn excluded the present I2-M438 clade as a whole, but only certain subclades, so these presumed cases I* may possibly belong to I2.)

A living Hazara male from Afghanistan has also been found to carry I*, with all known subclades of both I1 (M253) and I2 (M438) ruled out.

=== I1-M253 ===
Haplogroup I1-M253 (M253, M307, P30, P40) displays a very clear frequency gradient, with a peak frequency of approximately 35% among the populations of southern Norway, southwestern Sweden, and Denmark, and rapidly decreasing frequencies toward the edges of the historically Germanic-influenced world. A notable exception is Finland, where frequency in West Finns is up to 40%, and in certain provinces like Satakunta more than 50%. I1 is believed to have become common as a result of a founder effect during the Nordic Bronze Age, and subsequently spread throughout Europe during the Migration Period when Germanic tribes migrated from southern Scandinavia and northern Germany to other places in Europe.

Outside Fennoscandia, distribution of Haplogroup I1-M253 is closely correlated with that of Haplogroup I2a2-M436; but among Scandinavians (including both Germanic and Uralic peoples of the region) nearly all the Haplogroup I-M170 Y-chromosomes are I1-M253. Another characteristic of the Scandinavian I1-M253 Y-chromosomes is their rather low haplotype diversity (STR diversity): a greater variety of Haplogroup I1-M253 Y-chromosomes has been found among the French and Italians, despite the much lower overall frequency of Haplogroup I1-M253 among the modern French and Italian populations. This, along with the structure of the phylogenetic tree of I1-M253 strongly suggests that most living I1 males are the descendants of an initially small group of reproductively successful men who lived in Scandinavia during the Nordic Bronze Age.

=== I2-M438 ===
Haplogroup I2-M438, previously I1b, may have originated in southern Europe – it is now found at its highest frequencies in the western Balkans and Sardinia – some 15,000–17,000 years ago and developed into three main subgroups : I2-M438*, I2a-L460, I2b-L415 and I2c-L596.

==== I2a1a-M26 ====
Haplogroup I2a1a-M26 is notable for its strong presence in Sardinia. Haplogroup I-M170 comprises approximately 40% of all patrilines among the Sardinians, and I2a1a-M26 is the predominant type of I among them.

Haplogroup I2a1a-M26 is practically absent east of France and Italy, while it is found at low but significant frequencies outside of Sardinia in the Balearic Islands, Castile-León, the Basque Country, the Pyrenees, southern and western France, and parts of the Maghreb in North Africa, Great Britain, and Ireland. Haplogroup I2a1a-M26 appears to be the only subclade of Haplogroup I-M170 found among the Basques, but appears to be found at somewhat higher frequencies among the general populations of Castile-León in Spain and Béarn in France than among the population of ethnic Basques. The M26 mutation is found in native males inhabiting every geographic region where megaliths may be found, including such far-flung and culturally disconnected regions as the Canary Islands, the Balearic Isles, Corsica, Ireland, and Sweden.

The distribution of I2a1a-M26 also mirrors that of the Atlantic Bronze Age cultures, which indicates a potential spread via the obsidian trade or a regular maritime exchange of some of metallurgical products.

==== I2a1b-M423 ====
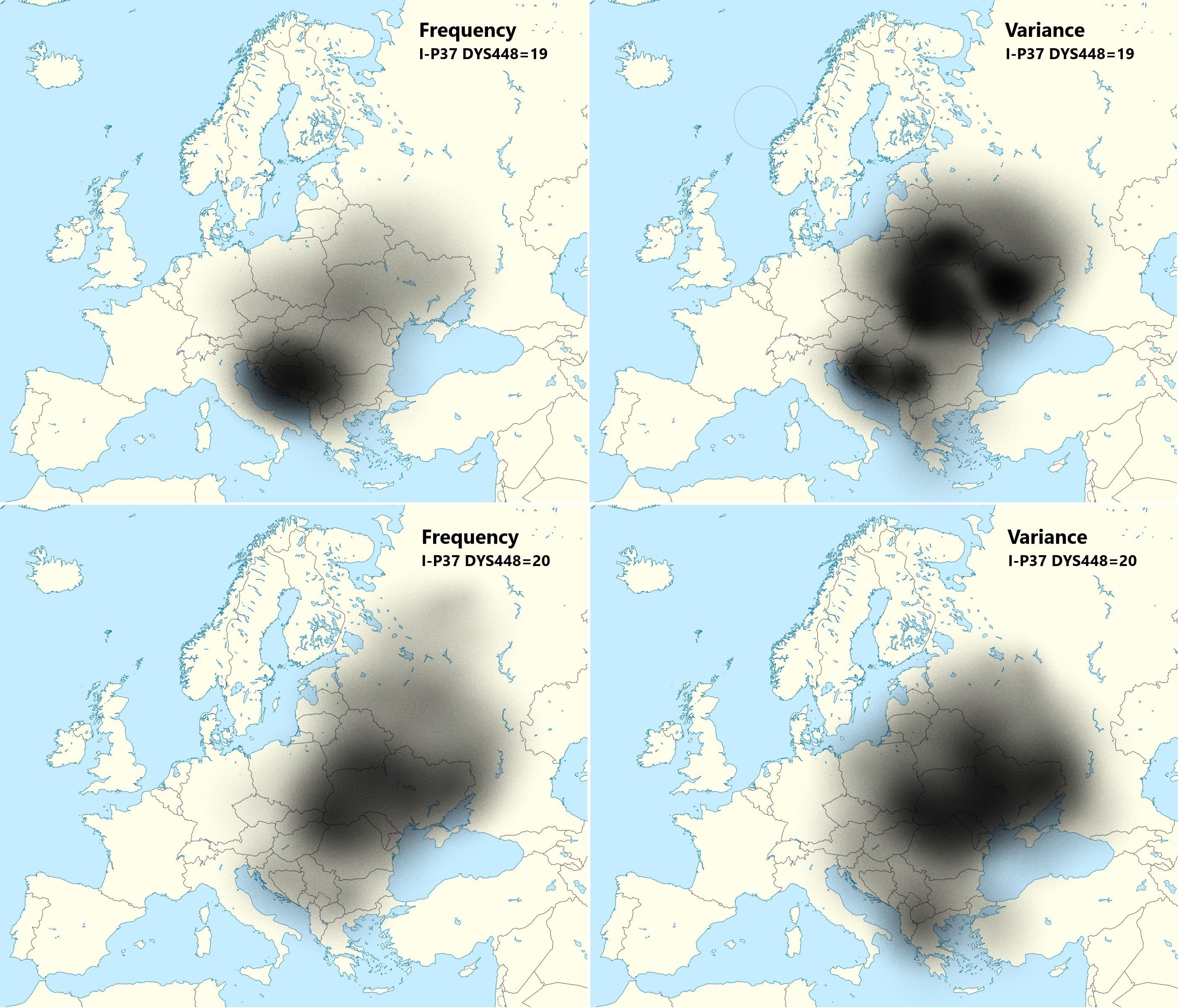
The approximate frequency and variance distribution of haplogroup I-P37 clusters, ancestral "Dnieper-Carpathian" (DYS448=20) and derived "Balkan" (DYS448=19: represented by a single SNP I-PH908), in Eastern Europe per O.M. Utevska (2017).

Haplogroup I2a1b-M423 is the most frequent Y-chromosome haplogroup I-M170 in Central and Eastern European populations, reaching its peak in the Western Balkans, most notably in Dalmatia (50–60%) and Bosnia-Herzegovina (up to 71%, avg. 40-50%). Its subclade I-L161 has greater variance in Ireland and Great Britain, but overall frequency is very low (2–3%), while subclade I-L162 has the highest variance and also high concentration in Eastern Europe (Ukraine, Southeastern Poland, Belarus).

==== I2a2-M436 ====
The distribution of Haplogroup I2a2-M436 (M436/P214/S33, P216/S30, P217/S23, P218/S32) is closely correlated to that of Haplogroup I1 except in Fennoscandia, which suggests that it was probably harbored by at least one of the Paleolithic refuge populations that also harbored Haplogroup I1-M253; the lack of correlation between the distributions of I1-M253 and I2a2-M436 in Fennoscandia may be a result of Haplogroup I2a2-M436's being more strongly affected in the earliest settlement of this region by founder effects and genetic drift due to its rarity, as Haplogroup I2a2-M436 comprises less than 10% of the total Y-chromosome diversity of all populations outside of Lower Saxony. Haplogroup I2a2-M436 has been found in over 4% of the population only in Germany, the Netherlands, Belgium, Denmark, England (not including Cornwall), Scotland, and the southern tips of Sweden and Norway in Northwest Europe; the provinces of Normandy, Maine, Anjou, and Perche in northwestern France; the province of Provence in southeastern France; the regions of Tuscany, Umbria, and Latium in Italy; and Moldavia and the area around Russia's Ryazan Oblast and Republic of Mordovia in Eastern Europe. One subclade of Haplogroup I2a2-M436, namely I2a2a1a1-M284, has been found almost exclusively among the population of Great Britain, which has been taken to suggest that the clade may have a very long history in that island. It is notable, however, that the distributions of Haplogroup I1-M253 and Haplogroup I2a2-M436 seem to correlate fairly well with the extent of historical influence of Germanic peoples. The punctual presence of both haplogroups at a low frequency in the area of the historical regions of Bithynia and Galatia in Turkey may be related to the Varangian Guard or rather suggests a connection with the ancient Gauls of Thrace, several tribes of which are recorded to have immigrated to those parts of Anatolia at the invitation of Nicomedes I of Bithynia. This suggestion is supported by recent genetic studies regarding Y-DNA Haplogroup I2b2-L38 have concluded that there was some Late Iron Age migration of Celtic La Tène people, through Belgium, to the British Isles including north-east Ireland.

Haplogroup I2a2-M436 also occurs among approximately 1% of Sardinians, and in Hazaras from Afghanistan at 3%.

== Specifications of mutation ==
The technical details of U179 are:

Nucleotide change (rs2319818): G to A
Position (base pair): 275
Total size (base pairs): 220
Forward 5′→ 3′: aaggggatatgacgactgatt
Reverse 5′→ 3′: cagctcctcttttcaactctca

== Height ==
Although height as a quantitative autosomal trait is not genetically related to Y-DNA haplogroups, it may be associated with unusually tall males, since those in the Dinaric Alps have been reported to be the tallest in the world, with an average male height of the range 180 cm (5 ft 11 in)–182 cm (6 ft 0 in) in the cantons of Bosnia, 184 cm (6 ft 0 in) in Sarajevo, 182 cm (6 ft 0 in)–186 cm (6 ft 1 in) in the cantons of Herzegovina mostly populated by Croats. A 2014 study examining the correlation between Y-DNA haplogroups and height found a correlation between the haplogroups I1, R1b-U106, I2a1b-M423 and tall males.

== See also ==
- Haplogroup
- Human Y-chromosome DNA haplogroups
- Haplogroup I1 (Y-DNA)
- Haplogroup I2 (Y-DNA)
- Late Glacial Maximum
- Aurignacian
- Proto-Indo-Europeans
- Gravettian

== Notes ==
- Barać L, Pericić M, Klarić IM, et al. (July 2003). "Y chromosomal heritage of Croatian population and its island isolates". Eur. J. Hum. Genet. 11 (7): 535–42. doi:10.1038/sj.ejhg.5200992. PMID 12825075. S2CID 15822710.
- Bennett, E.A., Prat, S., Péan, S., Crépin, L., Yanevich, A., Puaud, S., ... & Geigl, E. M. (2019). The origin of the Gravettians: genomic evidence from a 36,000-year-old Eastern European. BioRxiv, 685404.
- Rootsi, S, Kivisild, T, Benuzzi, G, Help, H, et al. (2019). "Phylogeography of Y-chromosome haplogroup I reveals distinct domains of prehistoric gene flow in Europe". Am. J. Hum. Genet. 75 (1): 128–137. Bibcode:2004AmJHG..75..128R. doi:10.1086/422196. hdl:10400.13/3045. PMC 1181996. PMID 15162323. S2CID 2834639.
- The Genographic Project, National Geographic, Atlas of the Human Journey
- ISOGG, Y-DNA Haplogroup I and its Subclades
