= Ardon, Russia =

Ardon (Russian: Ардон or Ардонь) is the name of several inhabited localities in Russia.

Urban localities

- Ardon, Republic of North Ossetia-Alania, a town in Ardonsky District of the Republic of North Ossetia-Alania

Rural localities

- Ardon, Bryansk Oblast, a selo under the administrative jurisdiction of the town of oblast significance of Klintsy in Bryansk Oblast
