= Ardon, Bryansk Oblast =

Classification system in Klintsy, Bryansk Oblast, Russia

Ardon Ардонь
- Selo
- Location within Bryansk Oblast Location within Russia
- Coordinates: 52°44′N 32°18′E
- Country: Russia
- Region: Bryansk Oblast
- District: Klintsy
- Time zone: UTC+3:00

Ardon (Russian: Ардонь) is a rural locality (a selo) in Klintsy, Bryansk Oblast, Russia. The population was 2,543 as of 2010. There are 52 streets.

== Geography ==
Ardon is located 6 km southeast of Klintsy (the district's administrative centre) by road. Klintsy is the nearest rural locality.
