= Ardonsky =

Ardonsky (masculine), Ardonskaya (feminine), or Ardonskoye (neuter) may refer to:

- Ardonsky District, a district of the Republic of North Ossetia-Alania
- Ardonskoye Urban Settlement, a municipal formation which Ardon Town Under District Jurisdiction in Ardonsky District of the Republic of North Ossetia-Alania, Russia is incorporated as
