= Leslie Ardon =

French basketball player

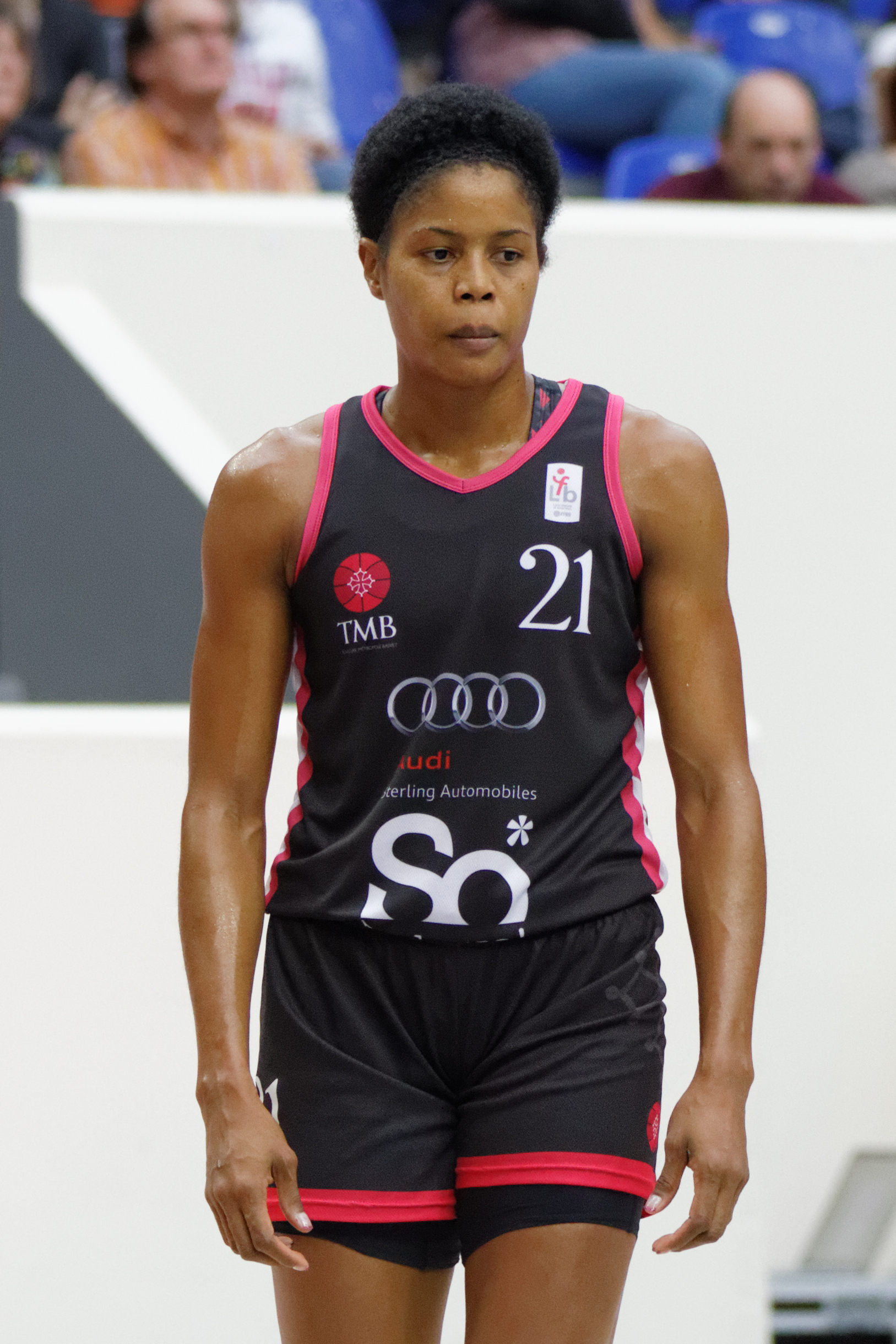
Ardon at Open LFB in Toulouse-Mondeville in 2013

Leslie Ardon (born 30 June 1979 in Marseille) is a French basketball player who plays for club Union Lyon of the Ligue Féminine de Basketball the top league of basketball for Women, in France.
