= The Horse, the Wheel, and Language =

2007 book by David W. Anthony

The Horse, the Wheel, and Language: How Bronze-Age Riders from the Eurasian Steppes Shaped the Modern World
- Cover of the first edition
- Author: David W. Anthony
- Language: English
- Subject: Indo-European migrations
- Publisher: Princeton University Press
- Publication date: 2007
- Media type: Print (Hardcover and Paperback)
- Pages: 568
- ISBN: 978-0-691-14818-2

The Horse, the Wheel, and Language: How Bronze-Age Riders from the Eurasian Steppes Shaped the Modern World is a 2007 book by the anthropologist David W. Anthony, in which the author describes his "revised Kurgan theory." He explores the origins and spread of the Indo-European languages from the Pontic–Caspian steppe throughout Western Europe, Central Asia, and South Asia. He shows how the domesticated horse and the invention of the wheel mobilized the steppe herding societies in the Eurasian Steppe, and combined with the introduction of bronze technology and new social structures of patron-client relationships gave an advantage to the Indo-European societies. The book won the Society for American Archaeology's 2010 Book Award.

== Synopsis ==
Anthony gives a broad overview of the linguistic and archaeological evidence for the early origins and spread of the Indo-European languages, describing a revised version of Marija Gimbutas's Kurgan hypothesis. Anthony describes the development of local cultures at the northern Black Sea coast, from hunter-gatherers to herders, under the influence of the Balkan cultures, which introduced cattle, horses and bronze technology.

When the climate changed between 3500 and 3000 BCE, with the steppes becoming drier and cooler, those inventions led to a new way of life in which mobile herders moved into the steppes, developing a new kind of social organisation with patron-client and host-guest relationships. That new social organisation, with its related Indo-European languages, spread throughout Europe, Central Asia and South Asia because of its ability to include new members within its social structures.

Part One covers theoretical considerations on language and archaeology. It gives an introductory overview of Indo-European linguistics (ch. 1); investigates the reconstruction of Proto-Indo-European (ch. 2); the dating of Proto-Indo-European (ch. 3); the specific vocabulary for wool and wheels (ch. 4); the location of the Proto-Indo-European homeland (ch. 5); and the correlation of these linguistic discoveries with archaeological evidence and the role of elite recruitment in language shift (ch. 6).

Part Two covers the development of the Steppe cultures and the subsequent migrations out of the Pontic-Caspian region into Europe, Central Asia, and South Asia. The splitting of the major branches of Indo-European (except perhaps Greek) can be correlated with archaeological cultures, showing steppe influences in a way that makes sense chronologically and geographically in light of linguistic reconstructions. Anthony gives an introduction to Part Two (ch. 7); describes the interaction between Balkan farmers and herders and steppe foragers at the Dniester River (in western Ukraine) and the introduction of cattle (ch. 8); the spread of cattle-herding during the Copper Age and the accompanying social division between high and low status (ch. 9); the domestication of the horse (ch. 10); the end of the Balkan cultures and the early migrations of Steppe people into the Danube Valley (ch. 11); the development of the steppe cultures during the Eneolithic, including the interaction with the Mesopotamian world after the collapse of the Balkan cultures and the role of Proto-Indo-European as a regional language (ch. 12); the Yamna culture as the culmination of these developments at the Pontic-Caspian steppes (ch. 13); the migration of Yamna people into the Danube Valley and the origins of the western Indo-European languages at the Danube Valley (Celtic, Italic), the Dniester (Germanic) and the Dnieper (Baltic, Slavic) (ch. 14); migrations eastward which gave rise to the Sintashta culture and Proto-Indo-Iranian (ch. 15); migrations of the Indo-Aryans southward through the Bactria-Margiana archaeological complex into Anatolia and India (ch. 16); and concluding thoughts (ch. 17).

== Contents ==
=== Part One: Language and Archaeology ===
==== Chapter One: The Promise and Politics of the Mother Language ====
Anthony introduces the similarities between a broad range of languages and their common ancestor, Proto-Indo-European (PIE). He proposes that "the Proto-Indo-European homeland was located in the steppes north of the Black and Caspian Seas in what is today southern Ukraine and Russia." Anthony gives a short overview of the history of the linguistical study of PIE and then presents six major problems that hinder a "broadly acceptable union between archaeological and linguistic evidence."

==== Chapter Three: Language and Time 1. The Last Speakers of Proto-Indo-European ====
Using a mathematical analysis borrowed from evolutionary biology, Don Ringe and Tandy Warnow propose the following evolutionary tree of Indo-European branches:

- Pre-Anatolian (before 3500 BCE)
- Pre-Tocharian
- Pre-Italic and Pre-Celtic (before 2500 BCE)
- [Pre-Germanic] (Note: David Anthony: "Germanic shows a mixture of archaic and derived traits that make its place uncertain; it could have branched off at about the same time as the root of Italic and Celtic [but] it also shared many traits with Pre-Baltic and Pre-Slavic.")
- Pre-Armenian and Pre-Greek (after 2500 BCE)
- [Pre-Germanic] Proto-Germanic c. 500 BCE
- Pre-Balto-Slavic
- Proto-Indo-Iranian (2000 BCE)

==== Chapter Four: Language and Time 2: Wool, Wheels and Proto-Indo-European ====
Anthony proposes that Proto-Indo-European emerged after ca. 3500 BCE. He bases that especially on his analysis of Indo-European terms for wool textiles and wheeled vehicles:

Neither woven wool textiles nor wheeled vehicles existed before about 4000 BCE. It is possible that neither existed before about 3500 BCE. Yet Proto-Indo-European speakers spoke regularly about wheeled vehicles and some sort of wool textile. This vocabulary suggests that Proto-Indo-European was spoken after 4000–3500 BCE.

==== Chapter Six: The Archaeology of Language ====
Anthony, following the methodology of Ringe and Warnow, proposes the following sequence:

- Pre-Anatolian (4200 BCE)
- Pre-Tocharian (3700 BCE)
- Pre-Germanic (3300 BCE)
- Pre-Italic and Pre-Celtic (3000 BCE)
- Pre-Armenian (2800 BCE)
- Pre-Balto-Slavic (2800 BCE)
- Pre-Greek (2500 BCE)
- Proto-Indo-Iranian (2200 BCE), split between Iranian and Old Indic 1800 BCE

A key insight is that early expansions of the area in which Indo-European was spoken were often caused by "recruitment", rather than only by military invasions. With the Yamnaya culture as a nucleus candidate, the original recruitment would be to a way of life in which intensive use of horses allowed herd animals to be pastured in areas of the Ukrainian / South Russian steppe, outside of river valleys.

=== Part Two: The Opening of the Eurasian Steppes ===
==== Chapter Eight: First Farmers and Herders: The Pontic-Caspian Neolithic ====
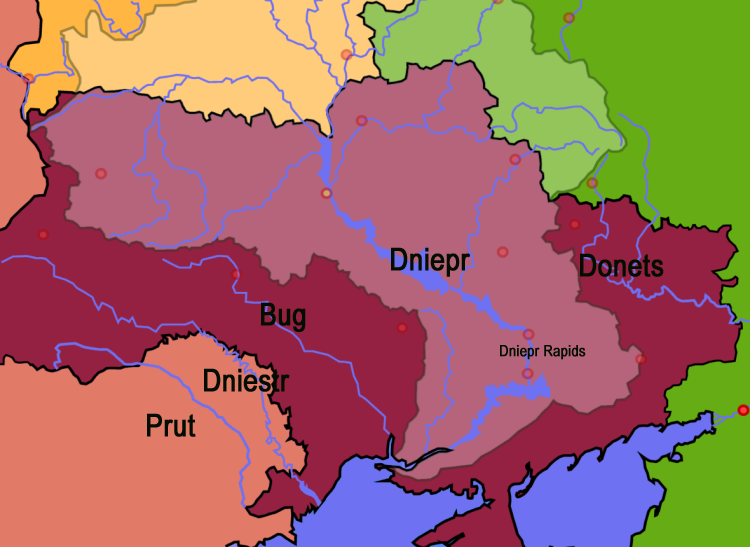
Ukraine rivers

According to Anthony, the development of the Proto-Indo-European cultures started with the introduction of cattle at the Pontic-Caspian steppes, which, until ca. 5200–5000 BCE, were populated by hunter-gatherers. The first cattle herders arrived from the Danube Valley at ca. 5800–5700 BCE, descendants from the first European farmers. They formed the Criş culture (5800–5300 BCE), creating a cultural frontier at the Prut-Dnister watershed.

The adjacent Bug-Dniester culture (6300–5500 BCE) was a local forager culture from which cattle-breeding spread to the steppe peoples. The Dniepr Rapids area was the next part of the Pontic-Caspian steppes to shift to cattle-herding. It was the most densely populated area of the Pontic-Caspian steppes at the time and had been inhabited by various hunter-gatherer populations since the end of the Ice Age. From ca. 5800–5200, it was inhabited by the first phase of the Dnieper-Donets culture, a hunter-gatherer culture contemporaneous with the Bug-Dniestr culture.

==== Chapter Nine: Cows, Copper and Chiefs ====
At ca. 5200–5000 BCE, the non-Indo-European Cucuteni-Tripolye culture (5200–3500 BCE) appears east of the Carpathian mountains, moving the cultural frontier to the Southern Bug valley, and the foragers at the Dniepr Rapids shifted to cattle herding, marking the shift to Dniepr-Donets II (5200/5000-4400-4200 BCE). The Dniepr-Donets culture kept cattle not only for ritual sacrifices but also for their daily diet. The Khvalynsk culture (4700–3800 BCE), located at the middle Volga, which was connected with the Danube Valley by trade networks, also had cattle and sheep, but they were "more important in ritual sacrifices than in the diet." According to Anthony, "the set of cults that spread with the first domesticated animals was at the root of the Proto-Indo-European conception of the universe" in which cattle had an essential role. The Samara culture (early 5th millennium BCE), (Note: There are several datings available: Gimbutas dated it to 5000 BCE.; According to V.A. Dergachev (2007), О скипетрах, о лошадях, о войне: Этюды в защиту миграционной концепции М. Гимбутас, ISBN 5-98187-173-3, dates Samara culture at cal. C-14 5200–4500 BCE, with a possible continuation into the first half of the 5th millennium, and the Khvalynsk culture is dated at ca. 4600–3900 BCE. The data are based on synchronisation, not the carbon dating or dendrochronology of Samara culture sites themselves.; Mallory and Adams, Encyclopedia of Indo-European Culture, gives the bare date "fifth millennium BC" and the Khvalynsk culture, its reported successor, is dated at 4900–3500 BC.) north of the Khvalynsk culture, interacted with the same. The steppe cultures were markedly different, economically and probably linguistically, from the Danube Valley and Balkan cultures at their west despite trade between them, the foragers of the northern forest zone, and from the cultures east of the Ural river.

==== Chapter Ten: The Domestication of the Horse and the Origins of Riding: The Tale of the Teeth ====
The domestication of the horse had a wide-ranging effect on the steppe cultures, and Anthony has done fieldwork on it. Bit wear is a sign of horse-riding, and the dating of horse teeth with signs of bit wear gives clues for the dating of the appearance of horse-riding. The presence of domesticated horses in the steppe cultures was an important clue for Marija Gimbutas's development of her Kurgan hypothesis. According to Anthony, horseback riding may have appeared as early as 4200 BCE, and horse artifacts show up in greater amounts after 3500 BCE. Horseback riding greatly increased the mobility of herders, allowing for greater herds, but also led to increased warfare by the need for additional grazing land.

==== Chapter Eleven: The End of Old Europe and the Rise of the Steppe ====
The Sredny Stog culture (4400–3300 BCE) appears at the same location as the Dniepr-Donets culture but shows influences from people who came from the Volga River region. The Sredni Stog culture was "the archaeological foundation for the Indo-European steppe pastoralists of Marija Gimbutas," and the period "was the critical era when innovative Proto-Indo-European dialects began to spread across the steppes."

Around 4200–4100 BCE, a climate change occurred, causing colder winters. Between 4200 and 3900 BCE, many tell settlements in the lower Danube Valley were burned and abandoned, and the Cucuteni-Tripolye culture showed an increase in fortifications and moved eastwards, towards the Dniepr.

Steppe herders, archaic Proto-Indo-European-speakers, spread into the lower Danube valley in about 4200–4000 BCE, causing or taking advantage of the collapse of Old Europe. According to Anthony, their languages "probably included archaic Proto-Indo-European dialects of the kind partly preserved later in Anatolian." According to Anthony their descendants later moved into Anatolia at an unknown time, maybe as early as 3000 BCE. According to Anthony, the herders, forming the Suvorovo-Novodanilovka complex, (Note: Also called Skelya culture, Suvorovo culture, Utkonsonovka group, and Novodanilovka culture.) probably were a chiefly elite from the Sredni Stog culture at the Dniepr Valley.

==== Chapter Twelve: Seeds of Change on the Steppe Borders. Maikop Chiefs and Tripolye Towns ====
The collapse of Old Europe led to a decrease in copper grave gifts in the North Pontic steppes. Between 3800 and 3300, substantial contact took place between the steppe cultures and Mesopotamia via the Maikop culture (3700–3000 BCE), in the northern Caucasus. To the west, Tripolye pottery begins to resemble Sredni Stog pottery, showing a process of assimilation between the Tripolye culture and the steppe cultures and a gradual breakdown of the cultural border between the two.

Between 3800 and 3300 BCE, five eneolithic steppe cultures can be discerned, and Proto-Indo-European dialects may have then served as a regional language.

- Mikhaylovka culture (3600—3000 BCE), on the Black Sea coast between the Dniestr and the Dniepr. Mikhailovka I people looked less like the Suvorovo-Novodanilovka people and may have intermarried more with Tripolye culture people or people from the Danube valley. Mikhailovka II upper level (3300–3000 BCE) imported pottery from the Repin culture (see below) and is regarded as early western Yamna. In the steppes northwest of the Black Sea l, the Mikhailovka culture was replaced by the Usatovo culture after 3300 BCE. The Mikhailovka culture at the Crimea developed into the Kemi Oba culture.
- Post-Mariupol culture (early phase 3800–3300 BCE, late phase 3300–2800 BCE): around the Dnieper Rapids, near the Donets River. According to Ina Potekhina, the people looked most like the Suvorovo-Novodanilovka people.
- Late/Phase II Sredny Stog culture (Dniepr-Donets-Don), c. 4000–3500 BCE.
- Repin culture (Don) and late Khvalynsk culture (lower Volga): the Repin culture developed by contact with the late Maikop-Novosvobodyana culture (Lower Don), which penetrated deeply into the Lower Volga steppe. Anthony also believes that Repin was highly significant to the establishment of the Afanasevo culture in eastern Siberia, c. 3700–3300 BCE.

==== Chapter Thirteen: Wagon Dwellers of the Steppes. The Speakers of Proto-Indo-European ====
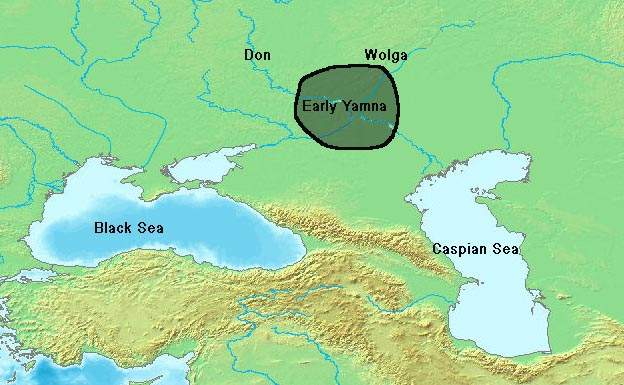
Location of early Yamna culture

The Yamna horizon (3300–2500 BCE) originated in the Don-Volga area, where it was preceded by the Middle Volga's Khvalynsk culture (4700–3800 BCE) and the Don-based Repin culture (ca.3950–3300 BCE), and late pottery from these two cultures can barely be distinguished from early Yamna pottery. The Afanasevo culture, at the western Altai Mountains, at the far eastern end of the steppes, was an offshoot from the Repin culture.

The Yamna horizon was an adaptation to a climate change between 3500 and 3000 BCE. The steppes became drier and cooler, herds needed to be moved frequently to feed them sufficiently, which was made possible by the use of wagons and horseback riding, leading to "a new, more mobile form of pastoralism." It was accompanied by new social rules and institutions to regulate the local migrations in the steppes, creating a new social awareness of a distinct culture, and of "cultural Others", who did not participate in the new institutions.

The early Yamnaya horizon spread quickly across the Pontic-Caspian steppes between ca. 3400 and 3200 BCE. According to Anthony, "the spread of the Yamnaya horizon was the material expression of the spread of late Proto-Indo-European across the Pontic-Caspian steppes." Anthony further notes that "the Yamnaya horizon is the visible archaeological expression of a social adjustment to high mobility – the invention of the political infrastructure to manage larger herds from mobile homes based in the steppes."

The Yamna horizon is reflected in the disappearance of long-term settlements between the Don and the Ural and the brief periods of usage of kurgan cemeteries, which begin to appear deep into the steppes between the major river valleys.

The eastern part (Volga-Ural-North Caucasian) of the Yamna horizon was more mobile than the western part (South Bug-lower Don), which was more farming-oriented. The eastern part more male-oriented, and the western part was more female-inclusive. The eastern part also had a higher number of males buried in kurgans, and its deities were male-oriented.

==== Chapter Fourteen: The Western Indo-European Languages ====
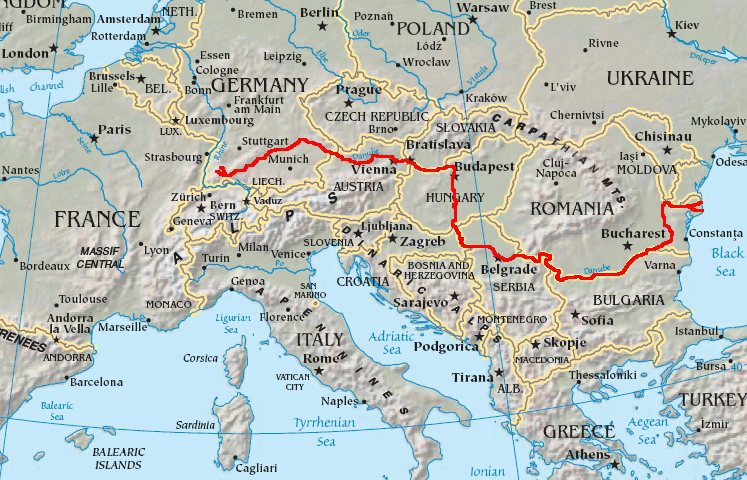
Course of the Danube, in red

According to Anthony, Pre-Italic, Pre-Celtic and Pre-Germanic may have split off in the Danube Valley and the Dniestr-Dniepr from Proto-Indo-European.

The Usatovo culture developed in southeastern Central Europe at around 3300–3200 BCE at the Dniestr. Although closely related to the Tripolye culture, it is contemporary with the Yamna culture and resembles it in significant ways. According to Anthony, it may have originated with "steppe clans related to the Yamnaya horizon who were able to impose a patron-client relationship on Tripolye farming villages." According to Anthony, the Pre-Germanic dialects may have developed in the culture between the Dniestr (western Ukraine) and the Vistula (Poland) in c. 3100–2800 BCE, and spread with the Corded Ware culture.

Approximate extent of the Corded Ware horizon with the adjacent 3rd-millennium cultures (Baden culture and Globular Amphora culture, Encyclopedia of Indo-European Culture)

Between 3100 and 2800/2600 BCE, when the Yamna horizon spread fast across the Pontic Steppe, a real folk migration of Proto-Indo-European-speakers from the Yamna-culture took place into the Danube Valley, moving along Usatovo territory toward specific destinations, reaching as far as Hungary, where as many as 3000 kurgans may have been raised. Bell Beaker sites at Budapest, dated c. 2800–2600 BCE, may have aided in spreading Yamna dialects into Austria and southern Germany in the west, where Proto-Celtic may have developed. Pre-Italic may have developed in Hungary, and spread toward Italy via the Urnfield culture and Villanovan culture. According to Anthony, Slavic and Baltic developed in the Middle Dniepr (Ukraine) in c. 2800 BCE, spreading north from there.

The Corded Ware culture in Middle Europe probably played an essential role in the origin and spread of the Indo-European languages in Europe during the Copper and Bronze Ages. According to Anthony, the Corded ware horizon may have introduced Germanic, Baltic and Slavic into Northern Europe.

==== Chapter Fifteen: Chariot Warriors of the Northern Steppes ====
The expansion eastwards of the Corded Ware culture, north of the steppe zone, led to the Sintashta culture, east of the Ural Mountains, which is considered to be the birthplace of the Indo-Iranians. Anthony skips over the post-Yamna cultures in the steppe zone (Late Yamnaya, Catacomb (2800–2200 BCE), and Poltavka (2700–2100 BCE)) but gives an extensive treatment of the intermediate Middle Dniepr culture (3200–2300 BCE) and of the Corded Ware cultures in the forest zone (Fatyanova (3200–2300 BCE), Abashevo (2500–1900 BCE), and Balanovo (3200–2300 BCE).

After ca. 2500 BCE, the Eurasian steppes became drier, peaking in ca. 2000 BCE, with the steppes southeast of the Ural mountains becoming even drier than the Middle Volga steppe. In ca. 2100 BCE, Poltavka and Abashevo herders moved into the upper Tobol and Ural river valleys, close to marshes which were needed for the survival of their herds. They built fortified strongholds, forming the Sintashta culture at the southern range of the Ural mountains. Via the BMAC, they stood in contact with middle eastern cities like Ur, and the Sintashta settlements reveal an extensive copper producing industry, producing copper for the Middle Eastern market. The Sintashta culture was shaped by warfare, which occurred in tandem with a growing long-distance trade. Chariots were an important weapon in the Sintashta culture and spread from there to the Middle East.

Anthony notes that "the details of the funeral sacrifices at Sintashta showed startling parallels with the sacrificial funeral rituals of the Rig Veda."

==== Chapter Sixteen: The Opening of the Eurasian Steppes ====
Steppe cultures between 2200 and 1800 BCE are the Multi-cordoned ware culture (2200–1800 BCE)(Dniepr-Don-Volga), Filatovka culture, and Potapovka. In the forest zone are the Late Middle Dniepr and the Late Abashevo cultures. East of the Urals are the Sintashta and the Petrovka cultures. East of the Caspian Sea is the non-Indo-European Late Kelteminar culture.

The Catacomb, Poltavka and Potapovka cultures were succeeded by the Srubna culture, and the Sintashta and Petrovka cultures were succeeded by the Andronovo culture.

== Reception ==
Anthony's work received generally positive reviews. The New York Times, noting the longstanding debate among scholars over the origins of the Indo-European language group, stated, "Anthony is not the first scholar to make the case that Proto-Indo-European came from [the steppes of southern Ukraine and Russia], but given the immense array of evidence he presents, he may be the last one who has to."

Geographer Arthur Krim discussed the work in Geographical Review. According to Krim, Anthony's "debate is with the archaeologist Colin Renfrew" and his Anatolian hypothesis, which proposed that early Proto-Indo-European developed by around 6500 BCE, originating in the famous Neolithic site at Çatalhöyük in Turkey. According to Krim,

Anthony offers convincing logic that the rate of linguistic change, as preserved in the first inscribed-tablet evidence of Indo-European branches as Hittite and the Vedic texts in India, rests on the invention of the wagon wheel and domesticated wool sheep between 4000 and 3500 B.C.E. These linguistic roots, not the older Anatolian-Near Eastern origins that Renfrew proposed, mark PIE after 4000 B.C.E.... David Anthony has produced convincingly detailed evidence that plants the origins of Indo-European culture firmly on the Russian-Ukrainian steppes by 3500 B.C.E. and demonstrates the spread of its horseback-riding innovations westward up the Danube River in Central Europe and eastward over the Iranian plateau into the Indus Valley.

The Rocky Mountain Modern Language Association's Rocky Mountain Review called the work "an archaeological feat" that "bridges the stubborn gap between linguists and archaeologists." The review noted with approval Anthony's drawing upon Soviet and Eastern European studies that had previously been unknown to western researchers.

The most critical review was Philip Kohl's "Perils of Carts before Horses: Linguistic Models and the Underdetermined Archaeological Record" in American Anthropologist. Kohl argues that Anthony's linguistic model is overly simple on the development of the Indo-European languages as products of divergence originating from one single source, though he admits that Anthony pays some attention to loanwords and the influence of neighboring cultures. Kohl is critical that Anthony's linguistic model guides "the archaeological interpretation rather than the reverse." According to Kohl, "such a procedure almost necessarily means that the archaeological record is consistently manipulated to fit the linguistic model that it is meant to confirm; the reasoning is circular." Kohl further notes that Anthony's reconstruction is bold and imaginative but is also "necessarily selective" and sometimes misleading when it relies on a rather limited number of items. According to Kohl,

the central problem with this book is its assumption that Indo-Europeans exclusively or nearly exclusively practiced certain cultural features, including technologies and even religious rituals. Was such exclusivity characteristic of the late prehistoric world or, rather, were peoples who spoke different languages continuously interacting with each other, adopting and transforming other peoples' practices and beliefs?

Kohl cautions about Anthony's proposal that horseback riding developed very early in the Chalcolithic in the Proto-Indo-European homeland. According to Kohl, horseback riding was almost invisible in the Ancient Near Eastern pictorial record until practically the end of the 3rd millennium BCE. Finally, Kohl notes that past fantasies about superior Aryans are dismissed by Anthony but that his descriptions of the influence of the Indo-European cultures on the Eurasian world may nevertheless feed into "fantasies about peculiarly gifted and creative Indo-Europeans–Aryans."

Nonetheless, Kohl also called the book a "magisterial synthesis of steppe archaeology" and stated that

the book's enduring value will be its rich and vivid synthesis of an extremely complex corpus of archaeological data from Neolithic times through the Bronze Age, stretching from the Balkans to Central Asia. Anthony writes extremely well and masterfully describes material culture remains, teasing out incredible amounts of information on the nature and scale of subsistence activities, social structure, and even ritual practices.

Kohl's critique was challenged by others, who noted that Anthony's extensive review of archaeological evidence suggested that he was using the linguistic model not to "'confirm' the 'archaeological record'" but "to interact with and help to explain [the archaeological record]."

== Awards ==
- The Society for American Archaeology's 2010 Book Award.

== Sources ==
- Anthony, David W. (2007). The Horse, the Wheel, and Language: How Bronze-Age Riders from the Eurasian Steppes Shaped the Modern World. Princeton University Press. ISBN 978-0-691-14818-2.
- Anthony, David W. (2010). The Horse, the Wheel, and Language: How Bronze-Age Riders from the Eurasian Steppes Shaped the Modern World. Princeton University Press. ISBN 978-1400831104.
- Kenneally, Christine (2 March 2008). "The Horse, the Wheel, and Language – David W. Anthony – Book Review". New York Times.
- Kohl, Philip L. (March 2009). "Perils of Carts before Horses: Linguistic Models and the Underdetermined Archaeological Record". American Anthropologist. 111 (1): 109–111. doi:10.1111/j.1548-1433.2009.01086.x.
- Krim, Arthur (1 January 2008). "Review of The Horse, the Wheel and Language: How Bronze-Age Riders from the Eurasian Steppes Shaped the Modern World". Geographical Review. 98 (4): 571–573. JSTOR 40377356.
- Lock, Suneeti Chhettri (2010). "Review of The Horse, the Wheel, and Language: How Bronze-Age Riders from the Eurasian Steppes Shaped the Modern World". Rocky Mountain Review. 64 (2, Autum): 218–220. JSTOR 29765447.
- Ostrowski, Don (Spring 2012). Maus, Tanya S. (ed.). "Review of The Horse, the Wheel and Language: How Bronze-Age Riders from the Eurasian Steppes Shaped the Modern World by David W. Anthony". Middle Ground Journal. College of St. Scholastica. Archived from the original on 30 June 2017.
- Princeton University Press (2010). "The Horse, the Wheel, and Language". Princeton University Press.
- Ringe, Don (2006). From Proto-Indo-European to Proto-Germanic. A Linguistic History of English. Vol. 1 (1st ed.). New York City: Oxford University Press. ISBN 978-0-19-928413-9. OCLC 64554645. OL 7405151M. Wikidata Q131605459.
