= Potapovka culture =

Bronze Age culture in Russia

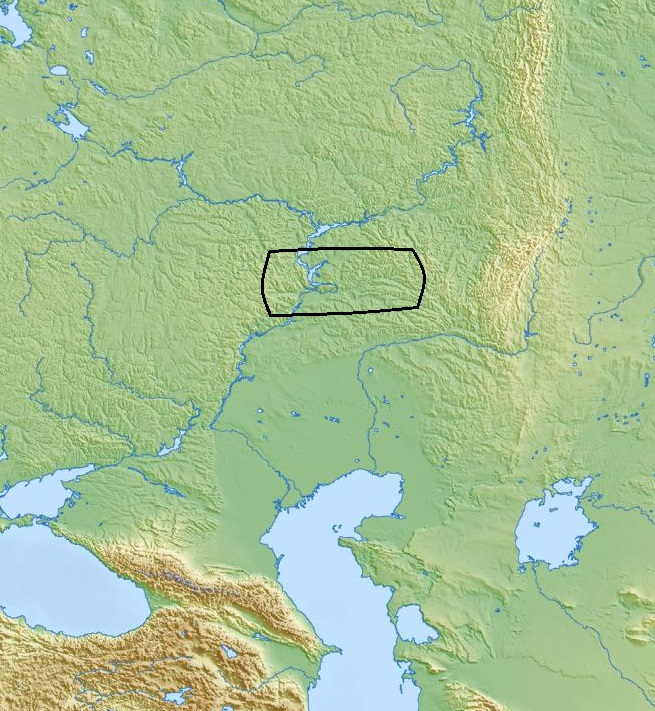
- Geographical range: Middle Volga
- Period: Bronze Age
- Dates: ca. 2100–1800 BC
- Type site: Potapovka
- Preceded by: Poltavka culture, Abashevo culture
- Followed by: Srubnaya culture, Andronovo culture

Potapovka culture (Russian: Потаповская культура, romanized: Potapovskaya kul'tura) was a Bronze Age culture which flourished on the middle Volga in 2100–1800 BC.

The Potapovka culture emerged from the Poltavka culture with influences from the Abashevo culture. It had close relations with the Sintashta culture in the east, with whom it shares many similarities. Like the Sintashta culture, its people are believed to have spoken a form of Proto-Indo-Iranian. It was directly ancestral to the Srubnaya culture, and probably influenced the emergence of the Andronovo culture.

== Chronology ==
The Potapovka culture emerged on the middle Volga around 2100 BC. It came to flourish around the middle Volga, the southwest Urals and western Kazakhstan. Potapovka sites are eventually found also on the Don and the Dnieper. The Potapovka culture has been considered a western variant of the Sintashta culture, with which it is closely related.

The Potapovka culture is thought to have emerged as a northern outgrowth of the Poltavka culture, with possible influences from the Abashevo culture. Influences from the Catacomb culture and the Multi-cordoned ware culture have also been detected. It is considered to have been part of an eastward expansion of cultures originating on the Pontic steppe. The expansion of the Potapovka culture, Sintashta culture and other cultures ultimately of Eastern European origin into western Kazakhstan and the southern Urals is believed to have occurred as an elite dominance migration.

The Potapovka culture came to an end about 1800 BC. The Potapovka culture and the Sintashta culture played major roles in the emergence of the Andronovo culture. The Andronovo culture is in turn considered ancestral to the Indo-Iranians. The early phases of the Srubnaya culture grew out of the Potapovka culture and the late Abashevo culture.

== Characteristics ==
The Potapovka culture is especially distinguished by the presence of bone cheek-pieces for controlling horses. One cheek-piece of the Potapovka culture was found to be decorated with a Mycenaean ornament. The Potapovka culture has many similarities with the Sintashta culture and the earlier phases of the Andronovo culture. These similarities include animal sacrifices (horse burials), burial rituals, chariot-gear, cheek-pieces and ceramics.

=== Burials ===
The Potapovka culture is primarily known from at least eleven kurgans that have been found. These contain around eighty burials. Potpovka kurgans measure around 24 to 30 m in diameter and stand up to half-a-meter in height. They typically contain chambers surrounded by small peripheral graves of large central burial chambers. Near the central burial complex, horses, cattle, sheep, goats and dogs may be found.

Several Potapovka kurgans were constructed on top of earlier Poltavka kurgans, which they destroyed. According to David W. Anthony, this is hardly accidental, testifying to a "symbolic connection" between the Poltavka and Potapovka people.

Potapovka grave goods includes decorated pottery, metal objects, bronze ornaments, and occasionally silver ornaments.

Graves of the Potapovka culture are very similar to those of the Sintashta culture. They both contained paired horses and cheekpieces.

=== Pottery ===
Ceramics of the Potapovka culture are very similar to those of the Poltavka culture. The same feature is noted among the Sintashta culture. Abashevo vessels have been found in Potapovka graves.

=== Vehicles ===
Possible remains of wheels and wheeled vehicles have been observed in Potapovka remains. Unlike for the Sintashta culture, spoked wheels have not been found in the Potapovka culture.

=== Weaponry ===
Major stone artifacts include flint arrowheads. Weapons discovered at Potapovka sites are very similar to those described in the Vedas and the Avesta.

== Genetics ==
In a study published in Nature in 2015, the remains of three individuals of the Potapovka culture was surveyed. One male was found to be carrying haplogroup R1a1a1b and U2e1h, while the other carried haplogroup P1 and C1. The female carried haplogroup T1.

In a genetic study published in Science in 2018, the remains four individuals ascribed to the Potapovka culture was analyzed. Of the two males, one carried R1a1a1b2a2a and U2e1, while the other carried R1 and C. The two females carried U2e1a1 and H2a1e. People of the Potapovka culture were found to be closely related to people of the Corded Ware culture, (Note: "[T]he Potapovka are well modeled as a mixture of the Corded Ware from the Czech Republic and Steppe_EMBA.") the Sintashta culture, the Andronovo culture and the Srubnaya culture. These were found to harbor mixed ancestry from the Yamnaya culture and peoples of the Central European Middle Neolithic. (Note: "We observed a main cluster of Sintashta individuals that was similar to Srubnaya, Potapovka, and Andronovo in being well modeled as a mixture of Yamnaya-related and Anatolian Neolithic (European agriculturalist-related) ancestry.") (Note: "Genetic analysis indicates that the individuals in our study classified as falling within the Andronovo complex are genetically similar to the main clusters of Potapovka, Sintashta, and Srubnaya in being well modeled as a mixture of Yamnaya-related and early European agriculturalist-related or Anatolian agriculturalist-related ancestry.") The genetic data suggested that these related cultures were ultimately derived from a remigration of Central European peoples with steppe ancestry back into the steppe. (Note: "Many of the samples from this group are individuals buried in association with artifacts of the Corded Ware, Srubnaya, Petrovka, Sintashta and Andronovo complexes, all of which harbored a mixture of Steppe_EMBA ancestry and ancestry from European Middle Neolithic agriculturalists (Europe_MN). This is consistent with previous findings showing that following westward movement of eastern European populations and mixture with local European agriculturalists, there was an eastward reflux back beyond the Urals.")

== Linguistics ==
The Potapovka culture is thought to belong to an eastward migration of Indo-European-speakers who eventually emerged as the Indo-Iranians. David W. Anthony considers the Potapovka culture and the Sintashta culture as archaeological manifestations of the early Indo-Iranian languages.

== Sources ==
- Anthony, David W. (2007). The Horse, the Wheel, and Language: How Bronze-Age Riders from the Eurasian Steppes Shaped the Modern World. Princeton University Press. ISBN 978-0-691-14818-2.
- Anthony, David W. (2010). The Horse, the Wheel, and Language: How Bronze-Age Riders from the Eurasian Steppes Shaped the Modern World. Princeton University Press. ISBN 978-1-4008-3110-4.
- Anthony, David W. (2016). "The Samara Valley Project and the Evolution of Pastoral Economies in the Western Eurasian Steppes". In Anthony, David W.; Brown, Dorcas R.; Molchalov, Oleg D.; Khokhlov, Aleksandr D.; Kuznetsov, Pavel F. (eds.). A Bronze Age Landscape in the Russian Steppes: The Samara Valley Project. UCLA Cotsen Institute of Archaeology Press. p. 3-36. ISBN 978-1-938770-05-0.
- Koryakova, Ludmila Vladimirovich [in Russian]; Epimakhov, Andrej (2007). The Urals and Western Siberia in the Bronze and Iron Ages. Cambridge World Archaeology. Cambridge University Press. ISBN 978-0-511-26996-7.
- Kuzmina, Elena E. (2007). Mallory, J. P. (ed.). The Origin of the Indo-Iranians. BRILL. ISBN 978-90-04-16054-5.
- Mallory, J. P.; Adams, Douglas Q. (1997). Encyclopedia of Indo-European Culture. Taylor & Francis. ISBN 1-884964-98-2.
- Narasimhan, Vagheesh M. (September 6, 2019). "The formation of human populations in South and Central Asia". Science. 365 (6457) eaat7487. American Association for the Advancement of Science. Bibcode:2019Sci...365t7487N. bioRxiv 10.1101/292581. doi:10.1126/science.aat7487. PMC 6822619. PMID 31488661.
- Parpola, Asko (2015). The Roots of Hinduism: The Early Aryans and the Indus Civilization. Oxford University Press. ISBN 978-0-19-022690-9.
