= Fatyanovo–Balanovo culture =

Archaeological culture in modern-day Russia

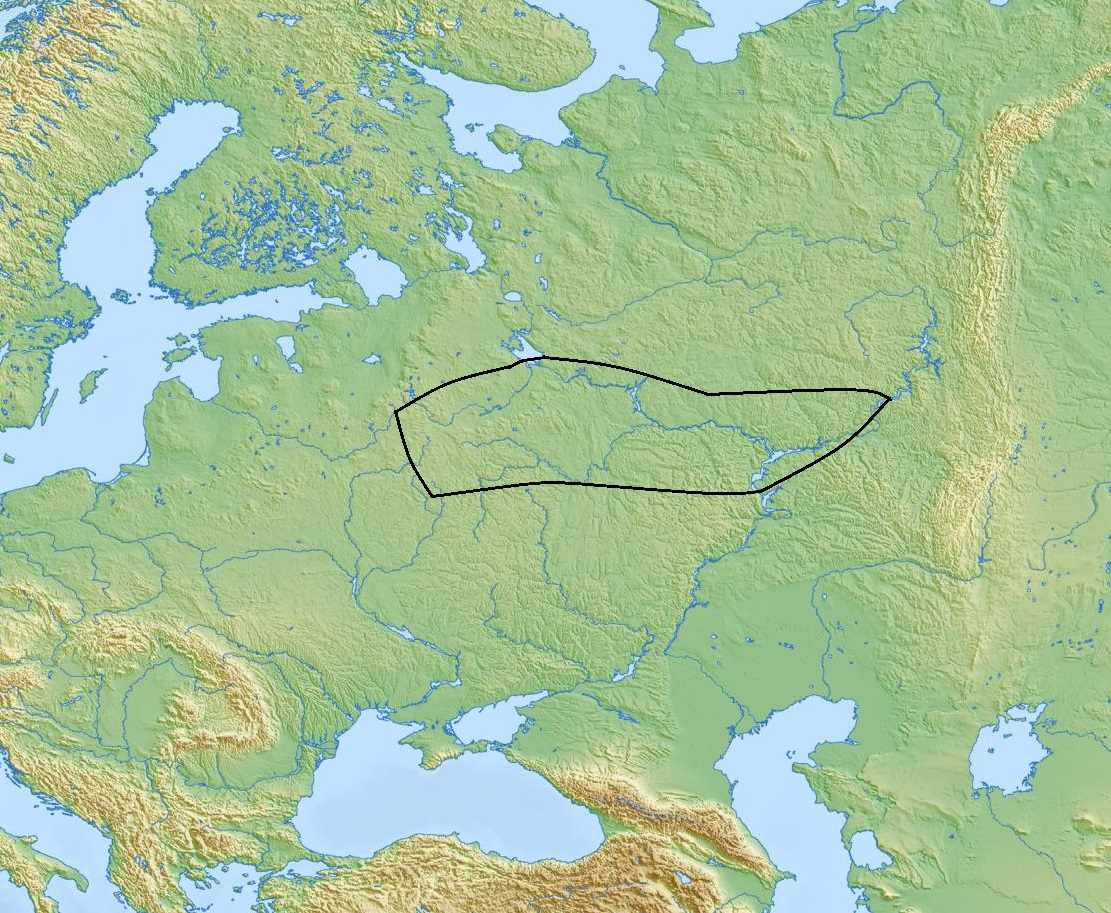
- Geographical range: Western Russia
- Period: Copper Age and early Bronze Age
- Dates: 2900–2050 BC
- Preceded by: Corded Ware culture, Middle Dnieper culture
- Followed by: Abashevo culture, Sintashta culture

The Fatyanovo–Balanovo culture (Russian: Фатьяновская культура, romanized: Fatyanovskaya kul'tura) was a Chalcolithic and early Bronze Age culture within the wider Corded Ware complex which flourished in the forests of Russia from c. 2900 to 2050 BC.

The Fatyanovo culture developed on the northeastern edge of the Middle Dnieper culture around 2900 BC, probably as a result of a mass migration of Corded Ware peoples from Central Europe. Expanding eastwards at the expense of the Volosovo culture, the Fatyanovo people developed copper mines in the western Urals. From 2300 BC they established settlements engaged in Bronze metallurgy, giving rise to the Balanovo culture. Although belonging to the southeastern part of the Fatyanovo horizon, the Balanovo culture is quite distinct from the rest. The Balanovo culture contributed to the formation of the Abashevo culture, which in turn contributed to the formation of the Sintashta culture.

The Fatyanovo–Balanovo culture ended about 2050 BC.

== History ==
=== Origins ===
The Fatyanovo culture emerged at the northeastern edge of the Middle Dnieper culture between 2900 BC and 2,800 BC, and was probably derived from an early variant of this culture. It has been described as the chronologically latest and most northeastern culture of the wider Corded Ware horizon. It traces its origins from the west and southwest.

The Fatyanovo culture has been described as a "genuine folk movement" from Central Europe in the Russian forests. Unlike other cultures of the Corded Ware horizon, the Fatyanovo culture is found beyond the borders of the earlier Funnelbeaker culture. The theory of the Fatyanovo–Balanovo culture being an intrusive one is based upon the physical type of the population (physical anthropology), flexed burial under barrows, the presence of battle-axes and ceramics.

Some have argued that this culture represents the acculturation of Pit-Comb Ware culture people of this area from contacts with Corded Ware agriculturists in the West. Others have noted similarities between Fatyanovo and Catacomb culture stone battle-axes.

=== Distribution ===
The Fatyanovo culture runs from Lake Pskov in the west to the middle Volga in the east, with its northern reach in the valley of the upper Volga. The Volosovo culture of indigenous forest foragers was different from the Fatyanovo culture in its ceramics, economy, and mortuary practices. It disappeared when the Fatyanovo people pushed into the Upper and Middle Volga basin.

Spreading eastward down the Volga the Fatyanovo people discovered the copper ores of the western Ural foothills, and started long term settlements in lower Kama river region. They occupied the region of the Kama–Vyatka–Vetluga interfluves where metal resources (local copper sandstone deposits) of the region were exploited. The metallurgy-based Fatyanovo settlements in this area gave rise to the Balanovo culture around 2300 BC. Although being part of the Fatyanovo horizon, the Balanovo culture is quite distinct from it. Ceramic finds indicate Balanovo coexisted with the Volosovo people (mixed Balanovo-Volosovo sites), and also displaced them. The Balanovo culture became the metallurgical heartland of the wider Fatyanovo horizon.

=== End ===
The end of the Fatyanovo–Balanovo culture is estimated at between 2050 BC and 1900 BC.

On its southeastern fringes, the Balanovo culture had contributed to the formation of the Abashevo culture. This culture would play an important role in the emergence of the Sintashta culture.

== Characteristics ==
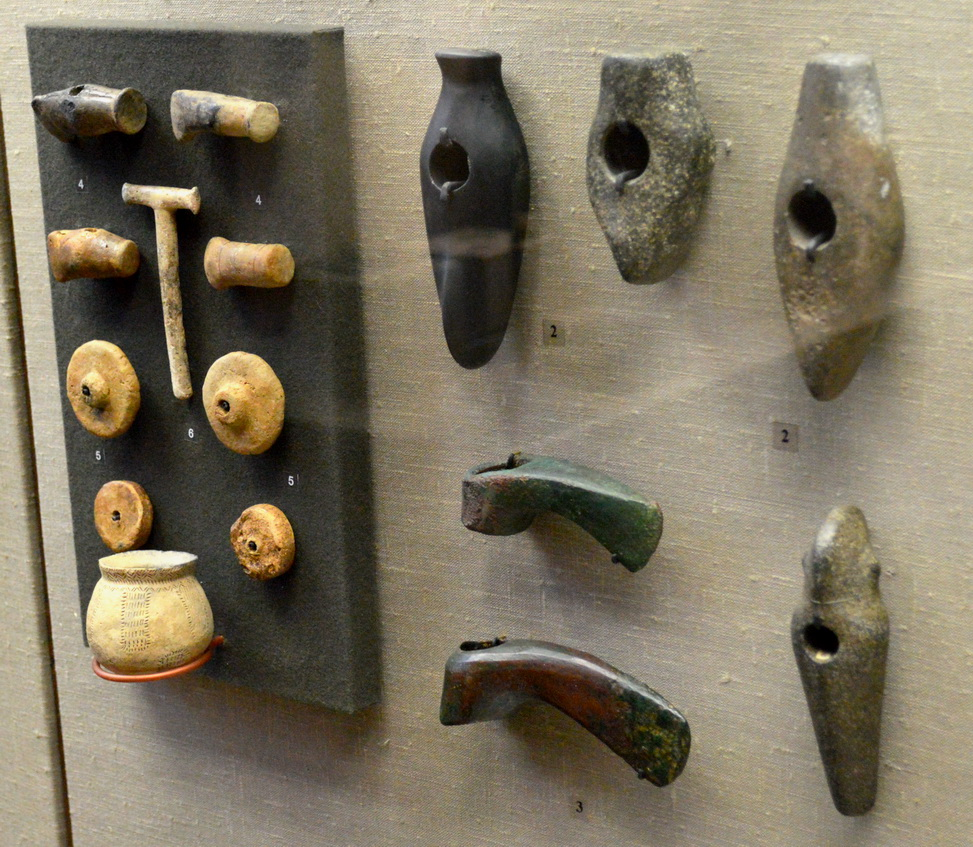
Fatyanovo–Balanovo artefacts including bronze axes

=== Ceramics ===
Fatyanovo ceramics show mixed Corded Ware/Globular Amphorae traits. The later Abashevo culture pottery looked somewhat like Fatyanovo-Balanovo Corded Ware.

=== Settlements ===
Settlements of the Fatyanovo culture are scant, and bear evidence of a degree of fortification. The villages were usually situated on the high hills of the riverbanks, consisting of several above-ground houses built from wooden logs with saddle roofs, and also joined by passages.

Hundreds of sites, including both settlements and cemeteries, have been found from the Balanovo culture. In Balanovo settlements, rectangular semi-subterranean houses are known. The absence of settlements are typical of the Corded Ware horizon, and are indicative of the mobile economy of the Fatyanovo-Balanovo people.

=== Economy ===
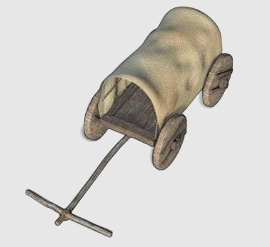
Illustration of a Fatyanovo wagon

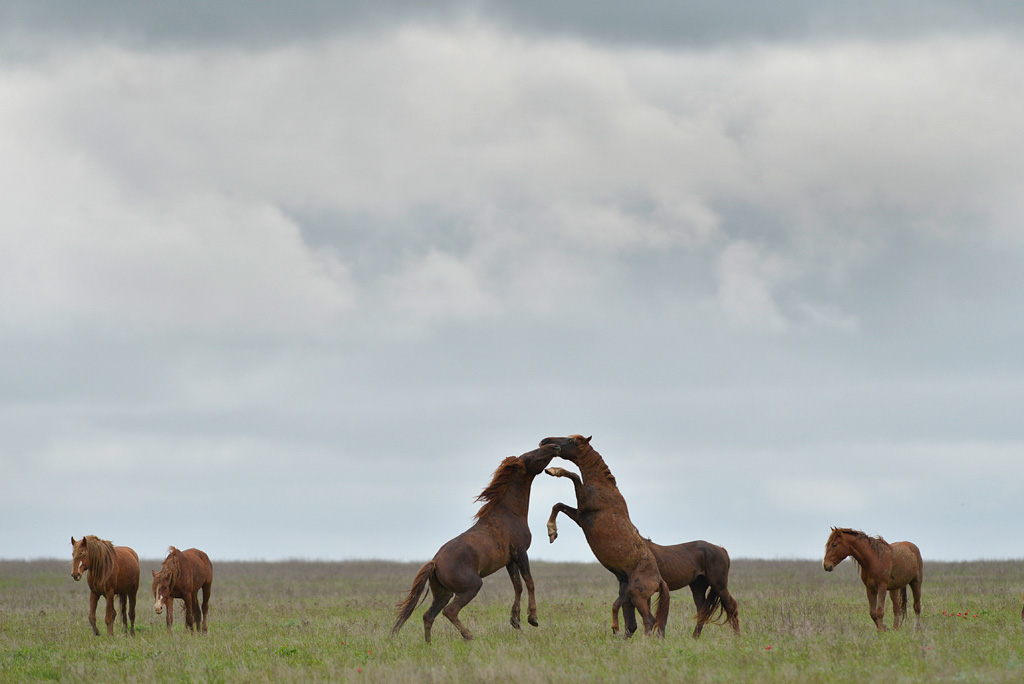
The Fatyanovo-Balanovo culture had domesticated horses

The economy seems to be quite mobile, but then we are cautioned that domestic swine are found, which suggests something other than a mobile society. The Fatyanovo culture is viewed as introducing an economy based on domestic livestock (sheep, cattle, horse & dog) into the forest zone of Russia.

The Balanovo also used draught cattle and two wheeled wagons.

=== Burials ===
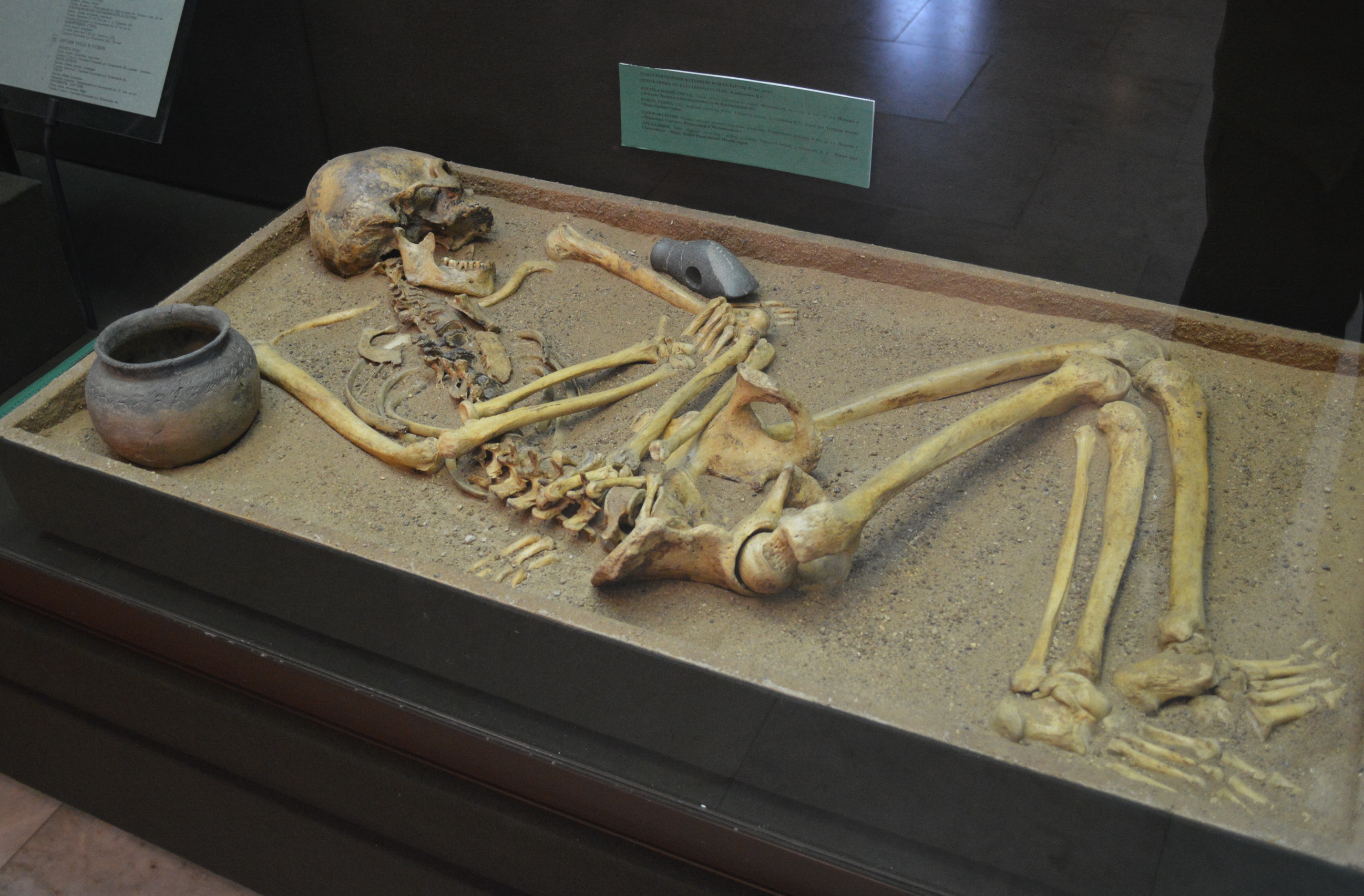
Fatyanovo burial

As is usual with ancient cultures, our main knowledge of the Fayanovo-Balanovo culture comes from their inhumations. Shaft graves were evident, which might be lined with wood.

Some three hundred cemeteries have been uncovered from the Fatyanovo culture. The largest of these contain more than a hundred burials. Some shaft graves are more than 2 m deep. The interments are otherwise in accord with Corded Ware practices, with males resting on their right side with their heads oriented towards the southwest, and females resting on their left side with their heads oriented towards the northeast. Grave goods included ornaments of animal teeth, pottery, polished stone battle-axes, and on some occasions stone mace-heads. Fatyanovo burials have been found to include bear claws and pendants of bear teeth. Similar founds have been made in the earlier Sredny Stog culture, Yamnaya culture and Catacomb culture. Some have interpreted this as a sign that the bear had a ritual-symbolic function in the Fatyanovo–Balanovo culture.

Balanovo burials (like the Middle Dnieper culture) were both of the flat and kurgan type, containing individual and also mass graves. The deceased were wrapped in animal skins or birch bark and placed into wooden burial chambers in subterranean rectangular pits. Burial goods depended on sex, age, and social position. Copper axes primarily accompanied persons of high social position, stone axe-hammers were given to men, flint axes to children and women. Amulets are frequently found in the graves. Abashevo kurgans are unlike Fatyanovo flat cemeteries, although flat graves were a recognizable component of the Abashevo burial rite.

=== Warfare ===
Numerous skeletons from Fatyanovo-Balanovo cemeteries show evidence of injury, including broken bones and smashed skulls. They were certainly a warlike people. It appears that they at one point were in serious conflict with people of the Abashevo culture.

=== Metalwork ===
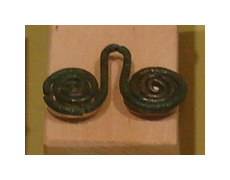
Copper spiral ornament

Local metal objects of a Central European provenance type were present in the Fatyanovo–Balanovo culture. That these metal objects were produced locally suggests the presence of skilled craftsmen. Copper ornaments and tools have been found in Balanovo burials (Chalcolithic). The Fatyanovo-Balanovo people exploited metal resources from the western Urals.

Spearheads of the Fatyanovo–Balanovo culture are similar to those of the later Sintashta culture, although the Sintashta ones were larger.

== Physical type ==
Physical remains of people of the Fatyanovo–Balanovo culture have revealed that they were Caucasoids/Europoids with dolichocephalic skulls. They were powerfully built. Fatyanovo–Balanovo skulls are very similar to those of the succeeding Abashevo culture, Sintashta culture, Srubnaya culture and Andronovo culture. Skulls of the Yamnaya culture and their direct descendants on the southern steppe are less dolichocephalic.

== Language ==
Many scholars have associated the Fatyanovo–Balanovo culture with a pre-Balto-Slavic (or pre-Balto-Slavic–Germanic) stage in the history of the Indo-European languages. J. P. Mallory links the Fatyanovo–Balanovo culture with Indo-European migrations. According to David W. Anthony, Fatyanovo migrations correspond to regions with hydronyms of a Baltic language dialect mapped by linguists as far as the Oka river and the upper Volga. Thus, the migrations of the Fatyanovo-Balanovo people might have established pre-Baltic populations in the upper Volga basin. The pre-Slavs probably developed among those peoples of the Middle-Dnieper culture who stayed behind.

== Genetics ==
Saag et al. (2021) examined 24 individuals of the Fatyanovo culture. They were mostly of steppe ancestry with moderate Early European Farmer (EEF) admixture. They were most closely related to Late Neolithic and Bronze Age populations of Central Europe, Scandinavia and the eastern Baltic, and also grouped together with modern Northern and Eastern Europeans. All 14 male samples belonged to subclades of Y-haplogroup R1a-M417. Six of these could be further specified to haplogroup R1a2-Z93. Haplogroup R1a2-Z93 is today prevalent in Central Asia and South Asia rather than in Europe. The 24 samples of mtDNA extracted belonged to various subclades of maternal haplogroups U5, U4, U2e, H, T, W, J, K, I and N1a. Both the paternal and maternal lineages of the examined Fatyanovo individuals were characteristic of the Corded Ware culture.

58% of the samples had an intermediate skintone and 80% of the samples had dark hair and brown eyes, with only 4% having blonde hair and 21% having blue eyes. Lactase persistence was only 17% in the Fatyanovo samples. The genetics of the people of the Fatyanovo culture was found to be substantially different from preceding Volosovo culture, with whom they do not appear to have mixed. Their EEF admixture has not been detected in the earlier Yamnaya culture, suggesting that the Fatyanovo people did not directly descend from the Yamnaya. The authors of the study suggested that the Fatyanovo culture emerged through a rapid migration towards the north-east from the Middle Dnieper culture of modern-day Ukraine and Belarus.

== See also ==
- Battle Axe culture
- Single Grave culture
- Beaker culture
- Unetice culture
- Catacomb culture
- Nordic Bronze Age

== Sources ==
- Anthony, David W. (2010). The Horse, the Wheel, and Language: How Bronze-Age Riders from the Eurasian Steppes Shaped the Modern World. Princeton University Press. ISBN 978-1-4008-3110-4.
- Czebreszuk, Janusz [in Polish] (2004). "Corded Ware From East To West". In Bogucki, Peter I.; Crabtree, Pam J. (eds.). Ancient Europe 8000 B.C.- A.D. 1000. Encyclopedia of the Barbarian World. Vol. 1. Scribner. pp. 431–435. ISBN 068480669X.
- Dolukhanov, Pavel Markovich (1996). The Early Slavs: Eastern Europe from the Initial Settlement to the Kievan Rus. Longman. ISBN 0582236185.
- Gimbutas, Marija (1963). The Origin of the Indo-Iranians. Praeger.
- Koryakova, Ludmila Vladimirovich [in Russian]; Epimakhov, Andrej (2007). The Urals and Western Siberia in the Bronze and Iron Ages. Cambridge World Archaeology. Cambridge University Press. ISBN 978-0-511-26996-7.
- Kuzmina, Elena E. (2007). Mallory, J. P. (ed.). The Origin of the Indo-Iranians. BRILL. ISBN 978-9004160545.
- Mallory, J. P.; Adams, Douglas Q. (1997). Encyclopedia of Indo-European Culture. Taylor & Francis. ISBN 9781884964985.
- Nordqvist, Kerkko; Heyd, Volker (2020). "The Forgotten Child of the Wider Corded Ware Family: Russian Fatyanovo Culture in Context". Proceedings of the Prehistoric Society. 86: 65–93. doi:10.1017/ppr.2020.9. hdl:10138/321831. S2CID 228923806.
- Parpola, Asko (2015). The Roots of Hinduism: The Early Aryans and the Indus Civilization. Oxford University Press. ISBN 9780190226916.
- Saag, Lehti; et al. (2021). "Genetic ancestry changes in Stone to Bronze Age transition in the East European plain". Science Advances. 7 (4). doi:10.1126/sciadv.abd6535. PMC 7817100. PMID 33523926.
