= Poltavka culture =

Early to middle Bronze Age archaeological culture of the middle Volga

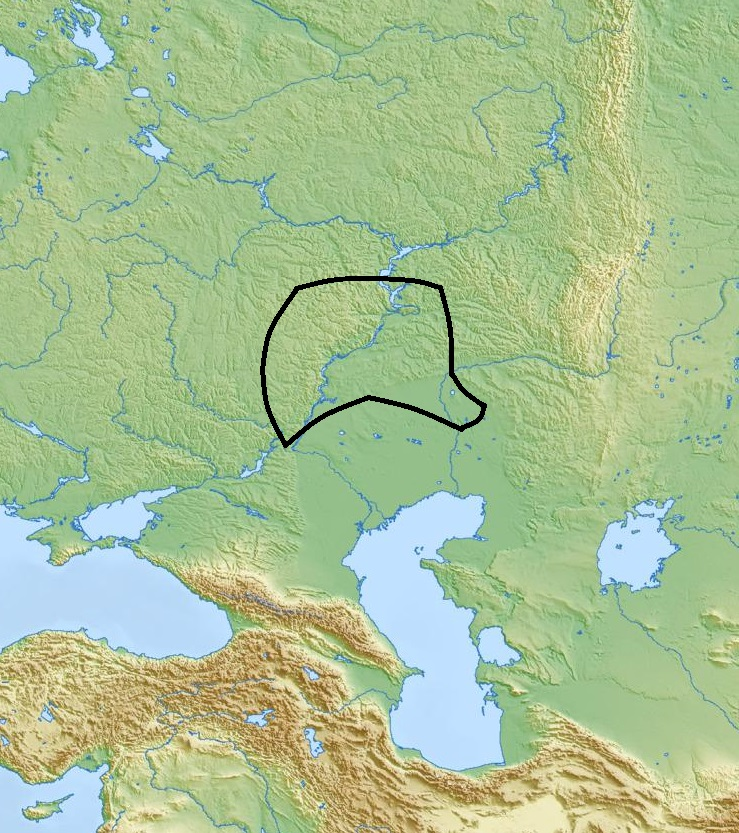
- Geographical range: Russia, Kazakhstan
- Period: Bronze Age
- Dates: c. 2800 BCE – 2100 BCE
- Preceded by: Yamnaya culture
- Followed by: Potapovka culture, Abashevo culture, Sintashta culture, Srubnaya culture.

Poltavka culture (Russian: Полтавкинская культура, romanized: Poltavkinskaya kul'tura) was an early to middle Bronze Age archaeological culture which flourished on the Volga-Ural steppe and the forest steppe in 2800–2100 BCE.

The Poltavka culture emerged as an eastern outgrowth of the Yamnaya culture, neighboring the Catacomb culture, another Yamnaya successor, in the west. It has been considered ancestral to later cultures that are identified as Indo-Iranian. The Poltavka culture influenced the later emergence of the Potapovka culture, Abashevo culture, Sintashta culture and Srubnaya culture.

== Origins ==
The Poltavka culture emerged ca. 2800 BC, as an eastern successor of the Yamnaya culture. The western successor of the Yamnaya culture was the Catacomb culture.

Along with the Sredny Stog culture, the Yamnaya culture and the Catacomb culture, the Poltavka culture is among the cultures of the Pontic steppe sharing archaeological characteristics with the Afanasievo culture of the eastern steppe.

== Distribution ==
The Poltavka culture flourished on the Volga-Ural steppe and the forest steppe. It is contemporary with the Catacomb culture, which was located on the Pontic steppe to its southwest. It seems to have co-existed at times with the Abashevo culture.

The Poltavka culture appears to have expanded eastwards throughout its existence. It is probable that Poltavka herders explored areas of the Kazakh Steppe. The arrival of Poltavka people onto the Kazakh Steppe is associated with various technological innovations in the area. Poltavka pottery has been discovered in northern Kazakhstan.

== Successors ==
The Poltavka culture lasted until 2200–2100 BC. It seems to be an early manifestation of the Srubnaya culture. It marks the transition of the Yamnaya culture to the Srubnaya culture. Genetic studies suggest that the end of the Poltavka culture is associated with major population changes.

The Abashevo culture appears to have emerged partially through influence from the Poltavka culture. Along with the Abashevo culture, it also appears to have influenced the emergence of the Potapovka culture.

The above mentioned eastward expansion of the Poltavka culture is associated with the emergence of the Sintashta culture and the later Andronovo culture, the Abashevo culture, the Multi-cordoned ware culture and the Catacomb culture.

Morphological data suggests that the Sintashta culture might have emerged as a result of a mixture of steppe ancestry from the Poltavka culture and Catacomb culture, with ancestry from Neolithic forest hunter-gatherers. (Note: "Morphological data suggests that both Fedorovka and Alakul' skeletons may be related to Sintashta groups, which in turn may reflect admixture of Neolithic forest HGs and steppe pastoralists, descendants of the Catacomb and Poltavka cultures.")

== Characteristics ==
Poltavka settlements are very rare. They are confined to sand dunes in the lower Volga area.

The flat-bottomed ceramics of the Poltavka culture differ from the pointed or round-based ceramics of the Yamnaya culture. The decorative motifs of the ceramics of the later Sintashta culture and Andronovo culture are very similar to those of the Poltavka culture.

The economy of the Poltavka culture was mobile pastoral, a continuation of the economy of the Yamnaya culture.

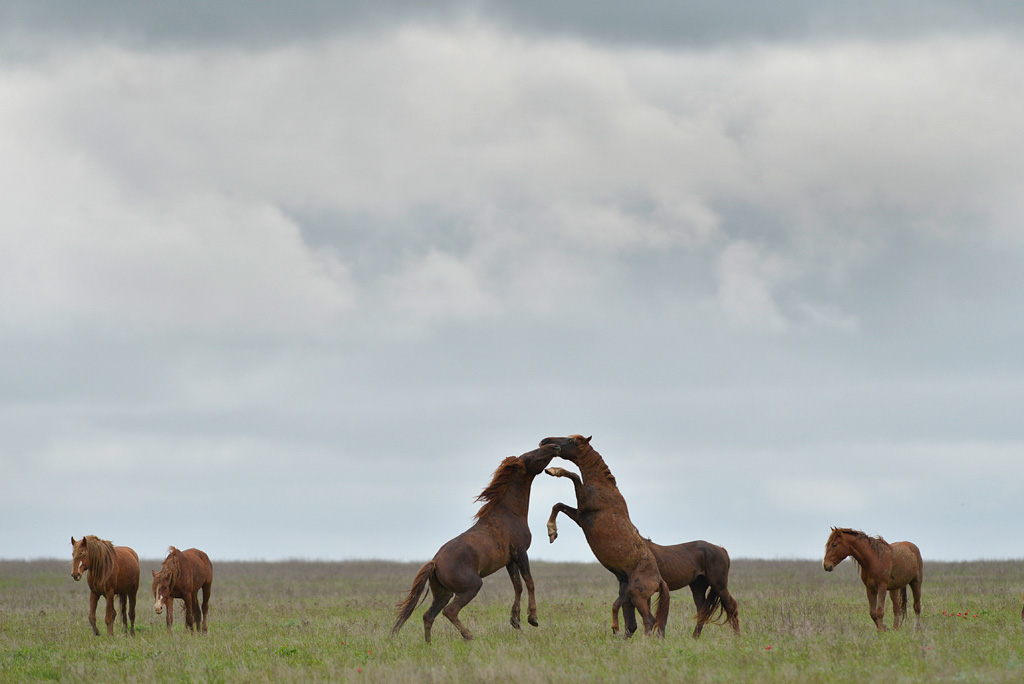
Horses were domesticated on the Pontic-Caspian steppe.

The Poltavka people carried out horse burials, a custom they inherited from the Yamnaya culture, the Khvalynsk culture and Samara culture respectively.

The Poltavka culture shares many characteristics with the contemporaneous Sintashta culture. This includes similar pottery, metal types, weapons, horse sacrifices, chariot-driving gear and similar graves. It is common for new Poltavka settlements to be constructed on top of older ones, and the later Sintashta culture would in turn construct settlements on top of earlier Poltavka ones.

=== Metal ===
The Poltavka culture is distinguished from the Yamnaya culture by its marked increase in metallurgy. Metals were probably acquired from centers in the southern Urals.

The presence of gold and silver rings and bronze axes similar to those of the Maykop culture, testify to North Caucasian influences on the Poltavka culture.

Certain metal objects of the Poltavka culture and the Catacomb culture appear to have been copied by the Abashevo culture.

=== Burials ===
The Poltavka culture is primarily known from its burials. These were situated in cemeteries along river terraces.

Poltavka graves differ slightly from those of the Yamnaya culture. Burial pits sometimes had a timber cover. They were generally inserted into kurgans of the Yamnaya culture. Poltavka kurgans were typically surrounded by a circular ditch, with a single grave with ledges.

80 percent of Poltavka graves contain males. Almost a third of Poltavka skulls show signs of wounds, often mortal. Both male and female dead were buried on their left side or back on an organic mat, with the head oriented towards the east. On occasion the body was covered with ocher, however, less common than in the earlier Yamnaya culture.

Poltavka burials are characterized by an increased presence of ornaments and weapons. This is interpreted as evidence of increased social stratification. Other grave goods include pottery and stone scepters. A Poltavka burial in the Volga region is notable for containing a large copper club.

The funeral customs of the Poltavka culture influenced the customs of the Abashevo culture further north.

== Genetics ==
Mathieson et al. (2015) analyzed six skeletons of the Poltavka culture. Five of them showed Y-haplogroup R1b1a2 and its subclades. One outlier belonged to Y-hg R1a1a1b2a. which notably was not included in the standard rich R1b burials. All were probably closely related to people of the Yamnaya culture and the Afanasievo culture.

Narasimshan et al. (2019) obtained seven times y-hg R1b 101 a2a (Z2103) and one R1a 1a1 (Z93-Z94), all from Samara. The authors noted a significant infusion of Central European ancestry into the steppe during the transition from the Poltavka culture to the Potapovka culture.

Other genomic studies suggest that the Poltavka culture was closely genetically related to both the peoples of the eastern Yamnaya culture and the later Sarmatians.

== Linguistics ==
The Poltavka culture has been considered ancestral to what would later develop into Indo-Iranian cultures.

== See also ==
- Corded Ware culture
- Bell Beaker culture

== Sources ==
- Anthony, David W. (2010). The Horse, the Wheel, and Language: How Bronze-Age Riders from the Eurasian Steppes Shaped the Modern World. Princeton University Press. ISBN 978-1-4008-3110-4.
- Kuzmina, Elena E. (2007). Mallory, J. P. (ed.). The Origin of the Indo-Iranians. BRILL. ISBN 978-90-04-16054-5.
- Kuznetsov, Pavel F.; Molchalov, Oleg D. (2016). "The Samara Valley in the Bronze Age: A Review of the Archaeological Discoveries". In Anthony, David W.; Brown, Dorcas R.; Molchalov, Oleg D.; Khokhlov, Aleksandr D.; Kuznetsov, Pavel F. (eds.). A Bronze Age Landscape in the Russian Steppes: The Samara Valley Project. UCLA Cotsen Institute of Archaeology Press. p. 71-90. ISBN 978-1-938770-05-0.
- Mallory, J. P.; Adams, Douglas Q. (1997). Encyclopedia of Indo-European Culture. Taylor & Francis. ISBN 1-884964-98-2.
- Narasimhan, Vagheesh M. (September 6, 2019). "The formation of human populations in South and Central Asia". Science. 365 (6457) eaat7487. American Association for the Advancement of Science. Bibcode:2019Sci...365t7487N. bioRxiv 10.1101/292581. doi:10.1126/science.aat7487. PMC 6822619. PMID 31488661.
