= Indo-Iranians =

Historical group of Indo-European peoples

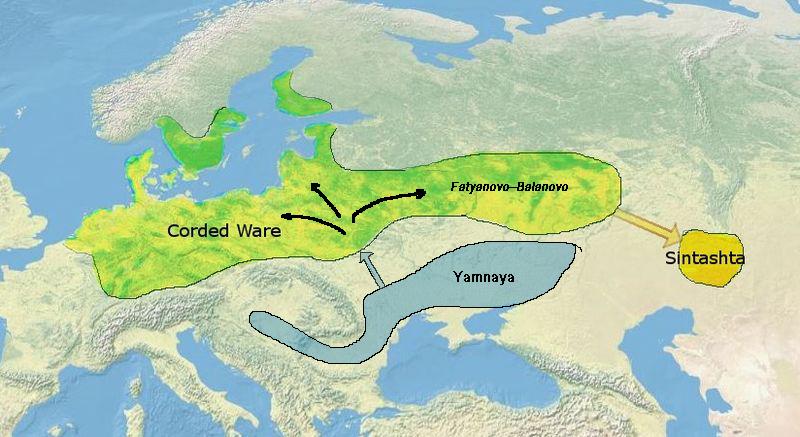
Map displaying the origins of the Proto-Indo-Iranian (Ā́rya/Aryan) Sintashta culture as a migration of peoples from the Bronze Age European Corded Ware culture through the Fatyanovo-Balanovo culture (Note: The exact relation between the Shintashta-culture and the Corded Ware culture remains unclear; while they are linguistically and culturally related, the genetic relation is still to be solved.)

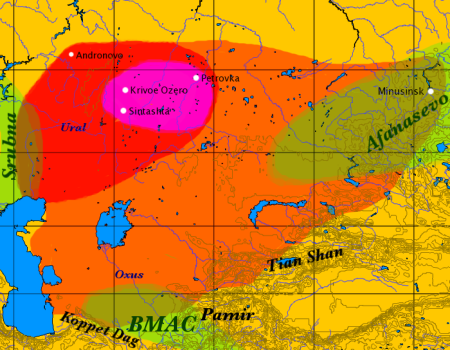
The Sintashta-Petrovka culture (red) expanded into the Andronovo culture (orange) in the 2nd millennium BC, overlapping the Oxus civilization (green) in the south; it includes the area of the earliest chariots (pink).

The Proto-Indo-Iranian peoples (or Indo-Iranian peoples, or Indo-Iranic peoples), also known as Ā́rya or Aryans from their self-designation, were a group of speakers of Proto-Indo-European languages who brought the offshoot Proto-Indo-Iranian languages to parts of Eurasia in waves from the first part of the 2nd millennium BC onwards. The original location of Indo-Iranians were thought to be north of modern-day Afghanistan, east of the Caspian Sea, in the area that is now Turkmenistan, Uzbekistan, and Tajikistan. They eventually branched out into the Iranian peoples who migrated south and west, while the Indo-Aryan peoples migrated south and east.

== Nomenclature ==
The term Aryan has long been used to denote the Indo-Iranians, because Ā́rya was the self-designation of the ancient speakers of the Indo-Iranian languages, specifically the Iranian and the Indo-Aryan peoples, collectively known as the Indo-Iranians. Despite this, some scholars use the term Indo-Iranian to refer to this group, though the term "Aryan" remains widely used by most scholars, such as Josef Wiesehofer, Will Durant, and Jaakko Häkkinen. Population geneticist Luigi Luca Cavalli-Sforza, in his 1994 book The History and Geography of Human Genes, also uses the term Aryan to describe the Indo-Iranians.

== History ==
=== Origin ===
The Proto-Indo-Iranians are commonly identified with the descendants of the Indo-Europeans known as the Sintashta culture and the subsequent Andronovo culture within the broader Andronovo horizon, and their homeland with an area of the Eurasian steppe that borders the Ural River on the west, the Tian Shan on the east (where the Indo-Iranians took over the area occupied by the earlier Afanasevo culture), and Transoxiana and the Hindu Kush on the south.

Based on its use by Indo-Aryans in Mitanni and Vedic India, its prior absence in the Near East and Harappan India, and its 19th–20th century BC attestation at the Andronovo site of Sintashta, Kuzmina (1994) argues that the chariot corroborates the identification of Andronovo as Indo-Iranian. (Note: Klejn (1974), as cited in Bryant 2001:206, acknowledges the Iranian identification of the Andronovo culture, but finds the Andronovo culture too late for an Indo-Iranian identification, giving a later date for the start of the Andronovo culture "in the 16th or 17th century BC, whereas the Aryans appeared in the Near East not later than the 15th to 16th century BC. Klejn (1974, p.58) further argues that "these [latter] regions contain nothing reminiscent of Timber-Frame Andronovo materials." Brentjes (1981) also gives a later dating for the Andronovo culture. Bryant further refers to Lyonnet (1993) and Francfort (1989), who point to the absence of archaeological remains of the Andronovans south of the Hindu Kush. Bosch-Gimpera (1973) and Hiebert (1998) argue that there also no Andronovo remains in Iran, but Hiebert "agrees that the expansion of the BMAC people to the Iranian plateau and the Indus Valley borderlands at the beginning of the second millennium BC is 'the best candidate for an archaeological correlate of the introduction of Indo-Iranian speakers to Iran and South Asia' (Hiebert 1995:192)". Sarianidi states that the Andronovo tribes "penetrated to a minimum extent".) Anthony & Vinogradov (1995) dated a chariot burial at Krivoye Lake to about 2000 BC, and a Bactria-Margiana burial that also contains a foal has recently been found, indicating further links with the steppes.

Historical linguists broadly estimate that a continuum of Indo-Iranian languages probably began to diverge by 2000 BC, preceding both the Vedic and Iranian cultures which emerged later. The earliest recorded forms of these languages, Vedic Sanskrit and Gathic Avestan, are remarkably similar, descended from the common Proto-Indo-Iranian language. The origin and earliest relationship between the Nuristani languages and that of the Iranian and Indo-Aryan groups is not completely clear.

=== Expansion ===
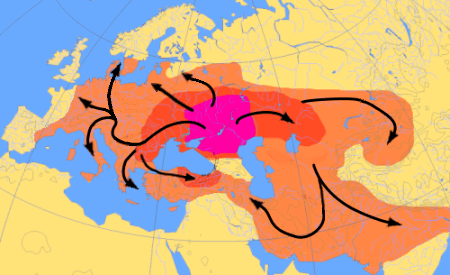
Indo-European migrations c. 4000 to 1000 BC according to the Kurgan hypothesis. Magenta indicates the assumed Urheimat (Samara culture, Sredny Stog culture), red the area which may have been settled by Indo-European-speaking peoples up to c. 2500 BC, and orange the area to 1000 BC.

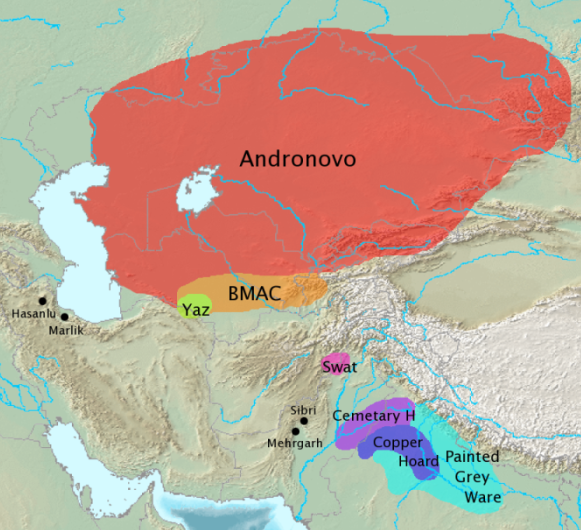
Archaeological cultures associated with Indo-Iranian migrations (after EIEC). The Andronovo, BMAC and Yaz cultures have often been associated with Indo-Iranian migrations. The GGC, Cemetery H, Copper Hoard and PGW cultures are candidates for cultures associated with Indo-Aryan movements.

==== First wave – Indo-Aryans ====
Two-wave models of Indo-Iranian expansion have been proposed by Burrow (1973) and Parpola (1999). The Indo-Iranians and their expansion are strongly associated with the Proto-Indo-European invention of the chariot. It is assumed that this expansion spread from the Proto-Indo-European homeland north of the Caspian Sea south to the Caucasus, Central Asia, the Iranian plateau, and the Indian subcontinent.

===== The Mitanni of Anatolia =====
The Mitanni, a people known in eastern Anatolia from about 1500 BC, were of possibly of mixed origins: An indigenous non Indo-European Hurrian-speaking majority was supposedly dominated by a non-Anatolian, Indo-Aryan elite. There is linguistic evidence for such a superstrate, in the form of:

- a horse training manual written by a Mitanni man named Kikkuli, which was translated into the Hittite language
- the names of Mitanni rulers and;
- the names of gods invoked by these rulers in treaties.

In particular, Kikkuli's text includes words such as aika "one" (i.e. a cognate of the Indo-Aryan eka), tera "three" (tri), panza "five" (pancha), satta "seven", (sapta), na "nine" (nava), and vartana "turn around", in the context of a horse race (Indo-Aryan vartana). In a treaty between the Hittites and the Mitanni, the Ashvin deities Mitra, Varuna, Indra, and Nasatya are invoked. These loanwords tend to connect the Mitanni superstrate to Indo-Aryan rather than Iranian languages – i.e. the early Iranian word for "one" was aiva.

===== Indian subcontinent – Vedic culture =====
The standard model for the entry of the Indo-European languages into the Indian subcontinent is that this first wave went over the Hindu Kush, either into the headwaters of the Indus and later the Ganges. The earliest stratum of Vedic Sanskrit, preserved only in the Rigveda, is assigned to roughly 1500 BC. From the Indus, the Indo-Aryan languages spread from c. 1500 BC – c. 500 BC, over the northern and central parts of the subcontinent, sparing the extreme south. The Indo-Aryans in these areas established several powerful kingdoms and principalities in the region, from south eastern Afghanistan to the doorstep of Bengal. The most powerful of these kingdoms were the post-Rigvedic Kuru (in Kurukshetra and the Delhi area) and their allies the Pañcālas further east, as well as Gandhara and later on, about the time of the Buddha, the kingdom of Kosala and the quickly expanding realm of Magadha. The latter lasted until the 4th century BC, when it was conquered by Chandragupta Maurya and formed the center of the Maurya Empire.

In eastern Afghanistan and some western regions of Pakistan, Indo-Aryan languages were eventually replaced by Eastern Iranian languages. Most Indo-Aryan languages, however, were and still are prominent in the rest of the Indian subcontinent. Today, Indo-Aryan languages are spoken in India, Pakistan, Bangladesh, Nepal, Sri Lanka, Fiji, Suriname and the Maldives.

==== Second wave – Iranians (Iranic peoples) ====
The second wave is interpreted as the Iranian wave.

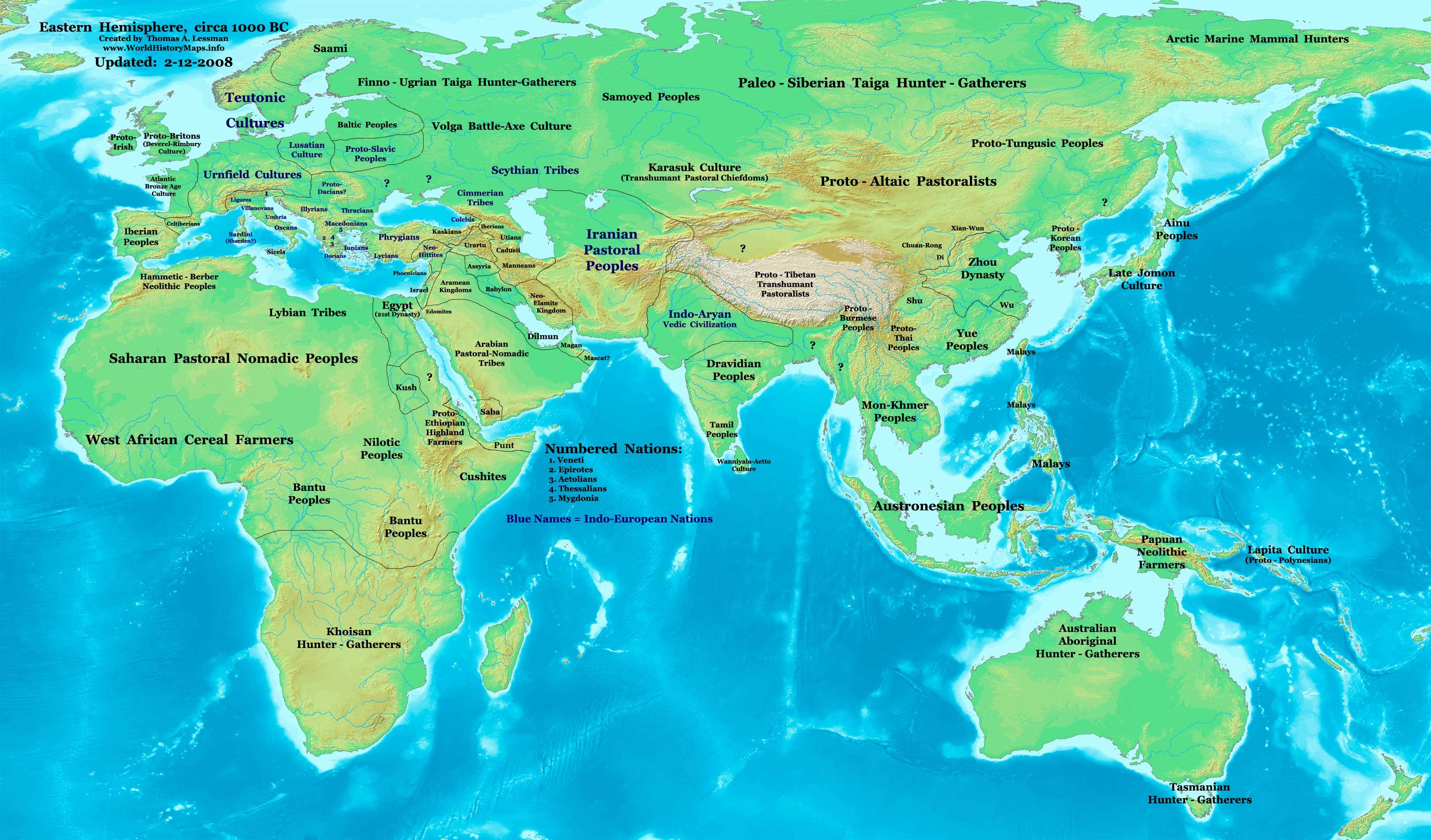
Eurasia around 1000 BC, showing location of the Iranians and their neighbors

The first Iranians to reach the Black Sea 'may' have been the Cimmerians in the 8th century BC, although their linguistic affiliation to Iranians is uncertain. They were followed by the Scythians, who are considered a western branch of the Central Asian Sakas. Sarmatian tribes, of whom the best known are the Roxolani (Rhoxolani), Iazyges (Jazyges) and the Alani (Alans), followed the Scythians westwards into Europe in the late centuries BC and the 1st and 2nd centuries AD (The Age of Migrations). The populous Sarmatian tribe of the Massagetae, dwelling near the Caspian Sea, were known to the early rulers of Persia in the Achaemenid Period. At their greatest reported extent, around 1st century AD, the Sarmatian tribes ranged from the Vistula River to the mouth of the Danube and eastward to the Volga, bordering the shores of the Black and Caspian seas as well as the Caucasus to the south. (Note: Apollonius (Argonautica, iii) envisaged the Sauromatai as the bitter foe of King Aietes of Colchis (modern Georgia).) In the east, the Saka occupied several areas in Xinjiang, from Khotan to Tumshuq.

The Medians, Persians and Parthians begin to appear on the Iranian plateau from c. 800 BC, and the Achaemenids replaced the language isolate speaking Elamites rule over the region from 559 BC, although the Iranic peoples were largely subject to the Semitic speaking Assyrian Empire until the 6th century BC. Around the first millennium AD, Iranian groups began to settle on the eastern edge of the Iranian plateau, on the mountainous frontier of northwestern and western Indian subcontinent, displacing the earlier Indo-Aryans from the area.

In Eastern Europe, the Iranians were eventually decisively assimilated (e.g. Slavicisation) and absorbed by the Proto-Slavic population of the region, while in Central Asia, the Turkic languages marginalized the Iranian languages as a result of the Turkic expansion of the early centuries AD. Extant major Iranian languages are Persian, Pashto, Kurdish, and Balochi besides numerous smaller ones. Ossetian, primarily spoken in North Ossetia and South Ossetia, is a direct descendant of Alanic, and by that the only surviving Sarmatian language of the once wide-ranging East Iranian dialect continuum that stretched from Eastern Europe to the eastern parts of Central Asia.

== Archaeology ==
Archaeological cultures associated with Indo-Iranian expansion include:

- Europe
  - Poltavka culture (2500–2100 BC)
  - Abashevo culture (2300–1850 BC)
  - Srubna culture (1850–1450 BC)
- Central Asia
  - Sintashta-Petrovka-Arkaim (2050–1750 BC)
  - Andronovo horizon (2000–1450 BC)
    - Alakul (2100–1400 BC)
    - Fedorovo (1400–1200 BC)
    - Alekseyevka (1200–1000 BC)
  - Bactria-Margiana Archaeological Complex (2200–1700 BC)
  - Yaz culture (1500–1100 BC)
- Indian subcontinent
  - Ochre Coloured Pottery culture (2000–1500 BC)
  - Cemetery H culture (1900–1300 BC)
  - Swat culture (1400–800 BC)
  - Painted Gray Ware culture (1200–600 BC)
- Iranian Plateau
  - Early West Iranian Grey Ware (1500–1000 BC)
  - Late West Iranian Buff Ware (900–700 BC)

Parpola (1999) suggests the following identifications:

Date range	Archaeological culture	Identification suggested by Parpola
2800–2000 BC	late Catacomb and Poltavka cultures	late PIE to Proto–Indo-Iranian
2000–1800 BC	Srubna and Abashevo cultures	Proto-Iranian
2000–1800 BC	Petrovka-Sintashta	Proto–Indo-Aryan
1900–1700 BC	BMAC	"Proto-Dasa" Indo-Aryans establishing themselves in the existing BMAC settlements, defeated by "Proto-Rigvedic" Indo-Aryans around 1700
1900–1400 BC	Cemetery H	Indian Dasa
1800–1000 BC	Alakul-Fedorovo	Indo-Aryan, including "Proto–Sauma-Aryan" practicing the Soma cult
1700–1400 BC	early Swat culture	Proto-Rigvedic
1700–1500 BC	late BMAC	"Proto–Sauma-Dasa", assimilation of Proto-Dasa and Proto–Sauma-Aryan
1500–1000 BC	Early West Iranian Grey Ware	Mitanni-Aryan (offshoot of "Proto–Sauma-Dasa")
1400–800 BC	late Swat culture and Punjab, Painted Grey Ware	late Rigvedic
1400–1100 BC	Yaz II-III, Seistan	Proto-Avestan
1100–1000 BC	Gurgan Buff Ware, Late West Iranian Buff Ware	Proto-Persian, Proto-Median
1000–400 BC	Iron Age cultures of Xinjiang	Proto-Saka

== Language ==
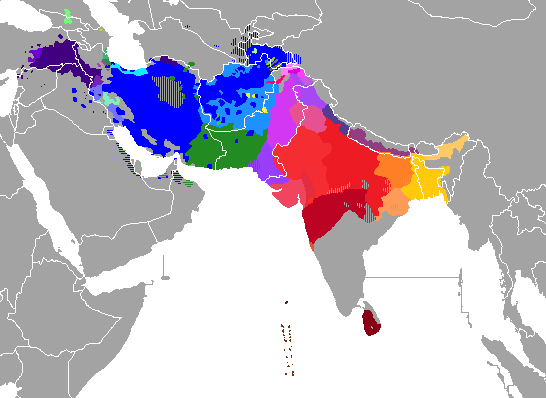
Indo-Iranian languages

The Indo-European language spoken by the Proto-Indo-Iranians in the late 3rd millennium BC was a Satem language still not removed very far from the Proto-Indo-European language, and in turn only removed by a few centuries from Vedic Sanskrit of the Rigveda. The main phonological change separating Proto-Indo-Iranian from Proto–Indo-European is the collapse of the ablauting vowels *e, *o, *a into a single vowel, Proto–Indo-Iranian *a (but see Brugmann's law). Grassmann's law and Bartholomae's law were also complete in Proto-Indo-Iranian, as well as the loss of the labiovelars (kw, etc.) to k, and the Eastern Indo-European (Satem) shift from palatized k' to ć, as in Proto–Indo-European *k'ṃto- > Indo-Iran. *ćata- > Sanskrit śata-, Old Iran. sata "100".

Among the sound changes from Proto-Indo-Iranian to Indo-Aryan is the loss of the voiced sibilant *z, among those to Iranian is the de-aspiration of the PIE voiced aspirates.

The regions where Indo-Iranian languages are spoken extend from Europe (Romani) and the Caucasus (Ossetian, Tat and Talysh), down to Mesopotamia (Kurdish languages, Zaza–Gorani and Kurmanji Dialect continuum) and Iran (Persian), eastward to Xinjiang (Sarikoli) and Assam (Assamese), and south to Sri Lanka (Sinhala) and the Maldives (Maldivian), with branches stretching as far out as Oceania and the Caribbean for Fiji Hindi and Caribbean Hindustani respectively. Furthermore, there are large diaspora communities of Indo-Iranian speakers in northwestern Europe (the United Kingdom), North America (United States, Canada), Australia, South Africa, and the Persian Gulf Region (United Arab Emirates, Saudi Arabia).

== Religion ==
Proto-Indo-Iranian religion is an archaic offshoot of Indo-European religion. From the various and dispersed Indo-Iranian cultures, a set of common ideas may be reconstructed from which a common, unattested proto-Indo-Iranian source may be deduced.

Indo-Iranians shared a common inheritance of concepts including the universal force *Hṛta- (Sanskrit rta, Avestan asha), the sacred plant and drink *sawHma- (Sanskrit Soma, Avestan Haoma) and gods of social order such as *mitra- (Sanskrit Mitra, Avestan and Old Persian Mithra, Miθra) and *bʰaga- (Sanskrit Bhaga, Avestan and Old Persian Baga). The Rig-Vedic Sarasvati is linguistically and functionally cognate with Avestan *Haraxvaitī Ārəduuī Sūrā Anāhitā. Both are described as world rivers. Vedic Saraswati is described as "Best of Mothers, Best of Rivers, Best of Goddesses". Similarly, in early portions of the Avesta, Iranian *Harahvati is the world-river that flows down from the mythical central Mount Hara. She is blocked by an obstacle (Avestan for obstacle: vərəθra) placed there by Angra Mainyu.

== Genetics ==
R1a1a (R-M17 or R-M198) is the sub-clade most commonly associated with Indo-European populations. Most discussions purportedly of R1a origins are actually about the origins of the dominant R1a1a (R-M17 or R-M198) sub-clade. R1a1a is found in two major variations: Z93 and Z282. R-Z93 appears to encompass most of the R1a1a found in Asia, being related to Indo-Iranians. On the other hand, R-Z282 is the main European branch of R1a1a predominantly related to Balts and Slavs in Eastern Europe. Data so far collected indicates high frequency of R-Z93 in the northern Indian subcontinent, Tajikistan, and Afghanistan: Bengali Brahmins carry up to 72% R1a1a, Mohana tribe up to 71%, Nepal Hindus up to 69.20%, and Tajiks up to 68%. In the western part of Iran, Iranians show low R1a1a levels, while males of eastern parts of Iran carry up to 35% R1a1a. The historical and prehistoric possible reasons for this are the subject of on-going discussion and attention amongst population geneticists and genetic genealogists, and are considered to be of potential interest to linguists and archaeologists also.

Out of 10 human male remains assigned to the Andronovo horizon from the Krasnoyarsk region, 9 possessed the R1a Y-chromosome haplogroup and one C-M130 haplogroup (xC3). MtDNA haplogroups of nine individuals assigned to the same Andronovo horizon and region were as follows: U4 (2 individuals), U2e, U5a1, Z, T1, T4, H, and K2b.

A 2004 study also established that during the Bronze Age/Iron Age period, the majority of the population of Kazakhstan (part of the Andronovo culture during the Bronze Age), was of west Eurasian maternal lineages (with mtDNA haplogroups such as U, H, HV, T, I and W), and that prior to the 13th–7th century BC, all Kazakh samples belonged to European lineages.

Steppe Middle and Late Bronze Age (Steppe MLBA) or Sintashta-related ancestry peaks in Northern Europe, particularly among Irish people, Norwegians, Swedes, Belarusians, Lithuanians, Scots and Icelanders. In South Asia, WSH ancestry reaches its highest levels in the northern Indian subcontinent, especially among Brahmin, Bhumihar, Ror, Jat, and Kalash.

Modern-day south-central Asians, particularly the Yaghnobis and Tajiks, both Eastern Iranian peoples, exhibit strong genetic continuity towards Iron Age Central Asians (Indo-Iranians), and were only marginally affected by outside geneflow, while modern Turkic peoples derive significant amounts of ancestry from a 'Baikal hunter-gatherer' source (mean average ~50%), with the remainder being ancestry maximized in Tajik people. Historical Indo-Iranians showed high genetic affinity towards European hunter-gatherers and Iranian Neolithic farmers.

== See also ==
- Proto-Indo-Iranian language
- Proto-Dravidian language
- Satemization
- Ariana
- Āryāvarta
- Dravidian peoples
- Indo-Aryan migrations

== Sources ==
- Anthony, David W. (2007), The Horse, The Wheel And Language. How Bronze-Age Riders From the Eurasian Steppes Shaped The Modern World, Princeton University Press, ISBN 978-0-691-14818-2
- Anthony, David W.; Vinogradov, Nikolai B. (1995). "Birth of the Chariot". Archaeology. 48 (2): 36–41. ISSN 0003-8113. JSTOR 41771098.
- Bryant, Edwin (2001), The Quest for the Origins of Vedic Culture: The Indo-Aryan Migration Debate, Oxford University Press, ISBN 978-0-19-513777-4
- Burrow, T. (1973), "The Proto-Indoaryans", Journal of the Royal Asiatic Society of Great Britain and Ireland, 105 (2): 123–140, doi:10.1017/S0035869X00130837, JSTOR 25203451, S2CID 162454265
- Diakonoff, Igor M.; Kuz'mina, E. E.; Ivantchik, Askold I. (1995), "Two Recent Studies of Indo-Iranian Origins", Journal of the American Oriental Society, vol. 115, no. 3, American Oriental Society, pp. 473–477, doi:10.2307/606224, JSTOR 606224.
- Haak, Wolfgang; Lazaridis, Iosif; Patterson, Nick; Rohland, Nadin; Mallick, Swapan; Llamas, Bastien; Brandt, Guido; Nordenfelt, Susanne; Harney, Eadaoin; Stewardson, Kristin; et al. (2015). "Massive migration from the steppe was a source for Indo-European languages in Europe". Nature. 522 (7555): 207–211. arXiv:1502.02783. Bibcode:2015Natur.522..207H. doi:10.1038/nature14317. ISSN 1476-4687. PMC 5048219. PMID 25731166.
- Jones-Bley, K.; Zdanovich, D. G. (eds.), Complex Societies of Central Eurasia from the 3rd to the 1st Millennium BC, 2 vols, JIES Monograph Series Nos. 45, 46, Washington D.C. (2002), ISBN 0-941694-83-6, ISBN 0-941694-86-0.
- Kuz'mina, Elena Efimovna (1994), Откуда пришли индоарии? (Whence came the Indo-Aryans), Moscow: Российская академия наук (Russian Academy of Sciences).
- Kuz'mina, Elena Efimovna (2007), Mallory, James Patrick (ed.), The Origin of the Indo-Iranians, Leiden Indo-European Etymological Dictionary Series, Leiden: Brill
- Lazaridis, Iosif; et al. (25 July 2016). "Genomic insights into the origin of farming in the ancient Near East". Nature. 536 (7617). Nature Research: 419–424. Bibcode:2016Natur.536..419L. doi:10.1038/nature19310. PMC 5003663. PMID 27459054.
- Mallory, J.P. (1989), In Search of the Indo-Europeans: Language, Archaeology, and Myth, London: Thames & Hudson.
- Mallory, J. P.; Adams, Douglas Q. (1997), "Indo-Iranian Languages", Encyclopedia of Indo-European Culture, Fitzroy Dearborn.
- Mallory, J. P.; Mair, Victor H. (2000), The Tarim Mummies: Ancient China and the Mystery of the Earliest People from the West, London: Thames & Hudson.
- Narasimhan, Vagheesh M.; Patterson, Nick; Moorjani, Priya; Rohland, Nadin; Bernardos, Rebecca (6 September 2019). "The formation of human populations in South and Central Asia". Science. 365 (6457) eaat7487. American Association for the Advancement of Science. Bibcode:2019Sci...365t7487N. bioRxiv 10.1101/292581. doi:10.1126/science.aat7487. ISSN 0036-8075. PMC 6822619. PMID 31488661.
- Parpola, Asko (1999), "The formation of the Aryan branch of Indo-European", in Blench, Roger; Spriggs, Matthew (eds.), Archaeology and Language, vol. III: Artefacts, languages and texts, London and New York: Routledge.
- Parpola, Asko (2015). The Roots of Hinduism: The Early Aryans and the Indus Civilization. Oxford University Press. ISBN 978-0-19-022692-3.
- Sulimirski, Tadeusz (1970), Daniel, Glyn (ed.), The Sarmatians, Ancient People and Places, Thames & Hudson, ISBN 0-500-02071-X
- Walker, Henry John (2021), The Twin Horse Gods: The Dioskouroi in Mythologies of the Ancient World, Bloomsbury
- Witzel, Michael (2000), "The Home of the Aryans" (PDF), in Hintze, A.; Tichy, E. (eds.), Anusantatyai. Fs. für Johanna Narten zum 70. Geburtstag, Dettelbach: J.H. Roell, pp. 283–338

== Bibliography ==
- Guarino-Vignon, Perle; Marchi, Nina; Bendezu-Sarmiento, Julio; Heyer, Evelyne; Bon, Céline (2022). "Genetic continuity of Indo-Iranian speakers since the Iron Age in southern Central Asia". Scientific Reports. 12 (1): 733. Bibcode:2022NatSR..12..733G. doi:10.1038/s41598-021-04144-4. PMC 8760286. PMID 35031610.
- Vasil'ev, I. B., P. F. Kuznetsov, and A. P. Semenova. "Potapovo Burial Ground of the Indo-Iranic Tribes on the Volga" (1994).
