= Abashevo culture =

Bronze Age culture of the Urals

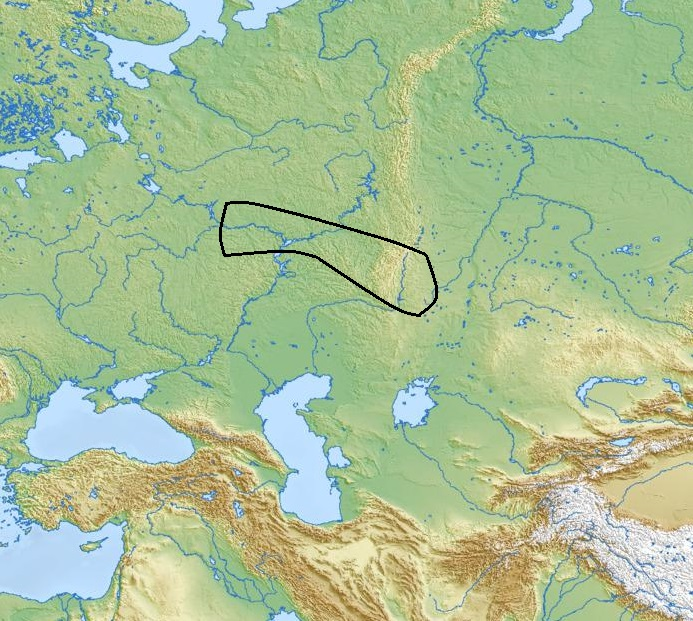
- Geographical range: Middle Volga and the southern Urals
- Period: Bronze Age
- Dates: c. 2200 – 1850 BC
- Type site: Abashevo
- Preceded by: Fatyanovo–Balanovo culture, Corded Ware, Poltavka culture, Catacomb culture, Volosovo culture
- Followed by: Sintashta culture, Potapovka culture, Srubnaya culture

The Abashevo culture (Russian: Абашевская культура, romanized: Abashevskaya kul'tura) is a late Middle Bronze Age archaeological culture, c. 2200–1850 BC, found in the valleys of the middle Volga and Kama River north of the Samara bend and into the southern Ural Mountains. It receives its name from the village of Abashevo in Chuvashia.

Tracing its origins in the Fatyanovo–Balanovo culture, an eastern offshoot of the Corded Ware culture of Central Europe, the Abashevo culture is notable for its metallurgical activity and evidence for the use of chariots in its end phase. It eventually came to absorb the Volosovo culture. The Abashevo culture is often viewed as pre-Indo-Iranian-speaking or Proto-Indo-Iranian-speaking. It played a major role in the development of the Sintashta culture and Srubnaya culture.

== Origins ==
The Abashevo culture is believed to have formed on the northern Don in the early 3rd millennium BC. It occupied part of the area of the earlier Fatyanovo–Balanovo culture, the eastern variant of the earlier Corded Ware culture.

Influences from the Yamnaya culture and Catacomb culture on the Abashevo culture are detected. The pre-eminent expert on the Abashevo culture, Anatoly Pryakhin, concluded that it originated from contacts between Fatyanovo–Balanovo, Catacomb and Poltavka peoples in the southern forest-steppe. The influence of the Yamnaya culture persisted until approximately 1700 BC with the emergence of new technologies, traditions, and customs.

The Abashevo culture represents an extension of steppe culture into the forest zone.

== Distribution ==
The Abashevo culture flourished in the forest steppe areas of the middle Volga and upper Don. The sites were represented largely by kurgan cemeteries and some areas with evidence of copper smelting. A few settlements extended in the northern steppes of the middle Volga.

The Abashevo culture appears to have absorbed parts of the Volosovo culture. Contacts with the Volosovo culture appears to have facilitated the spread of pastoralism and metallurgy into northern forest cultures.

The easternmost sites of the Abashevo culture are located along the southern Urals. Those sites are associated with the origins of the Sintashta culture. The Abashevo culture is divided into a Don-Volga variant, a middle Volga variant and a southern Ural variant. On the northern Don, the Abashevo culture replaced the Catacomb culture. Along the middle Volga, it co-existed with the Poltavka culture.

Elena E. Kuzmina suggests that the Seima-Turbino phenomenon emerged as a result of interaction between the Abashevo culture, the Catacomb culture and the early Andronovo culture.

== Characteristics ==
Abashevo culture: b. Women's headdress, c. Reconstructed house (c. 10x4m) from Beregovskiye, d. Cheek-piece for horse-bridle from Utyevka, e. Abashevo burial from Pikshiki

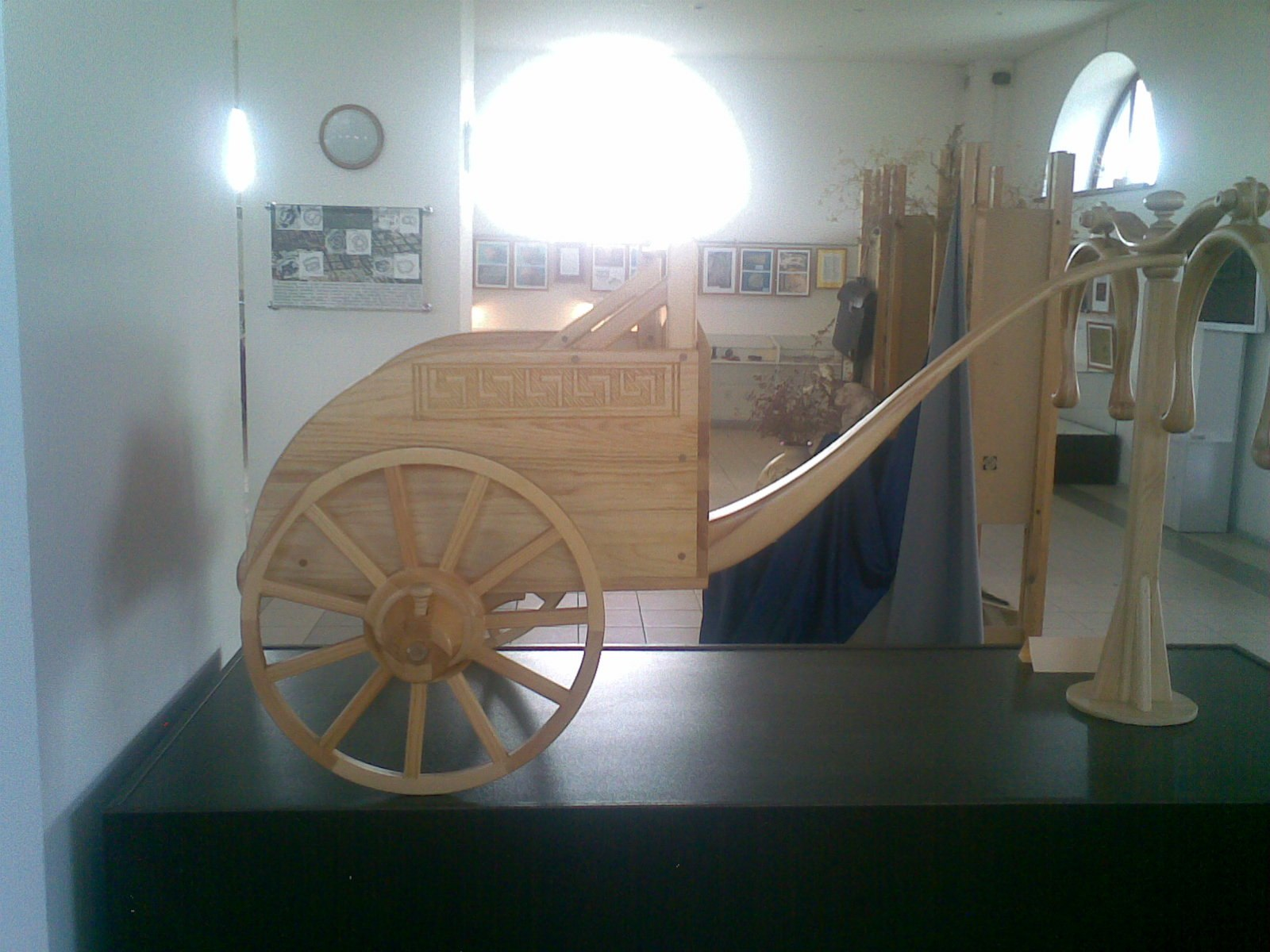
Chariot model, Arkaim museum

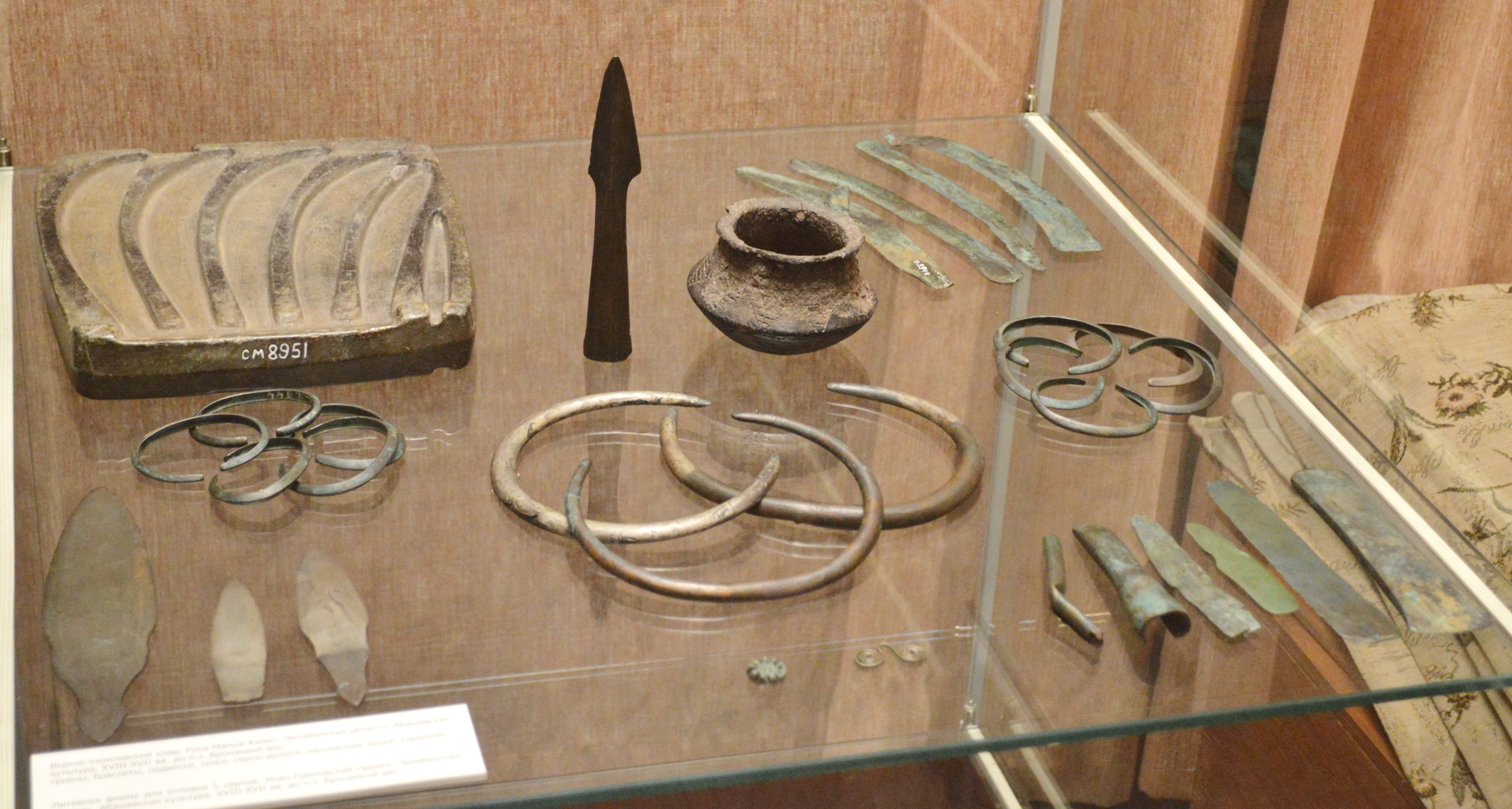
Jewellery and tools from an Abashevo culture hoard

=== Settlements ===
The type site of the Abashevo culture is at Abashevo, Chuvash Republic. More than two hundred settlements have been found. Houses were rectangular with large floor areas of about 150 to 200 m². Some settlements appear to have been occupied only briefly, and just two of them appear to have been fortified.

=== Burials ===
The Abashevo culture is primarily represented by various kurgan cemeteries. Kurgans were surrounded by a circular ditch, and the grave pit had ledges at its edges. The body was either contracted on the side, or supine with raised knees, with legs flexed. Its funerary customs appear to have been derived from the Poltavka culture. Its inhumation practices in tumuli are similar to the Yamnaya culture and Fatyanovo–Balanovo culture.

Flat graves are a component of the Abashevo culture burial rite, as in the earlier Fatyanovo culture. The kurgans of the Abashevo culture are to be distinguished from the flat graves of the Fatyanovo–Balanovo culture. A well-known Abashevo kurgan in Pepkino contained the remains of twenty-eight males who appear to have died violent deaths.

Grave offerings are scant, little more than a pot or two usually made with crushed-shell temper. Some graves show evidence of a birch bark floor and a timber construction forming walls and roof. High-status Abashevo graves contain silver and copper ornaments, and weapons. Crucibles for smelting copper and moulds for casting were found in some graves, most likely funerals reserved to bronzesmiths.

=== Clothing ===
High-status Abashevo women are notable for wearing a distinctive type of headband with pendants made of copper and silver. These headbands are unique to the Abashevo culture, and are probably an ethnic marker and symbol of political status.

The diadems of the Abashevo women are very similar to those of elite women in Mycenaean Greece. Elena Efimovna Kuzmina cites this as evidence of cultural synchronization between these ancient cultures.

=== Ceramics ===
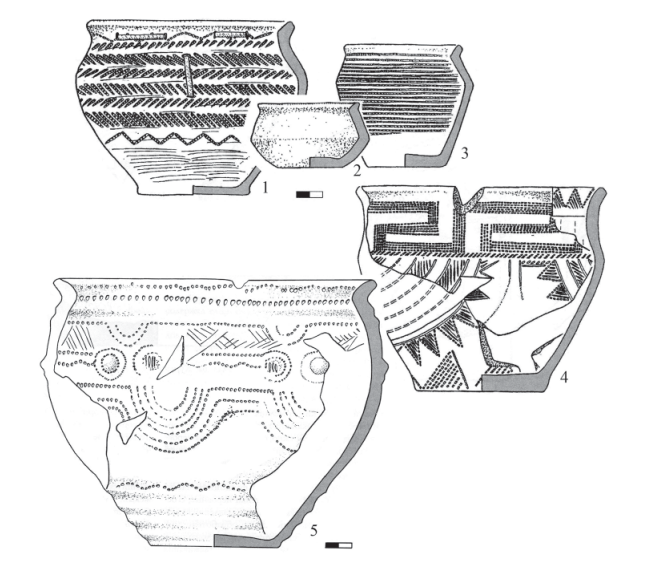
Pottery with Abashevo features from Kamenny Ambar

Abashevo ceramics display influences from the Catacomb culture, which was located further south. Its ceramics in turn influence those of the Sintashta culture.

=== Metal ===
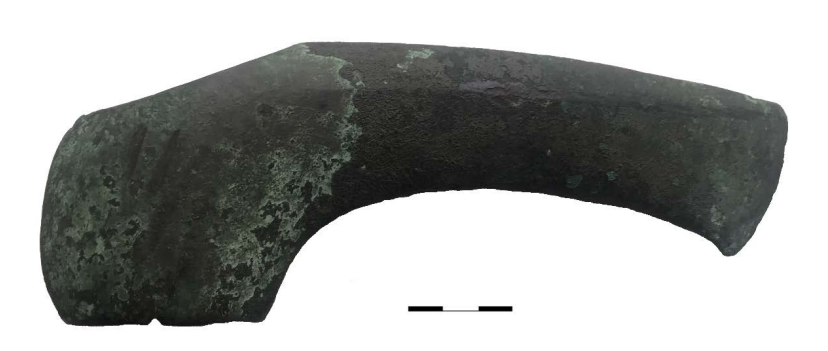
Bronze battle axe

The Abashevo culture was an important center of metallurgy, as the southern Urals provided a major source of local copper. There is evidence of copper smelting, and the culture engaged in copper mining activities, which stimulated the formation of Sintashta metallurgy.

About half of Abashevo metal objects are of copper, while the other half is of bronze. Silver-bearing ores were also extracted, from which silver ornaments were made. Abashevo metal types, such as knives were very similar to those of the Catacomb culture and the Poltavka culture.

=== Economy ===
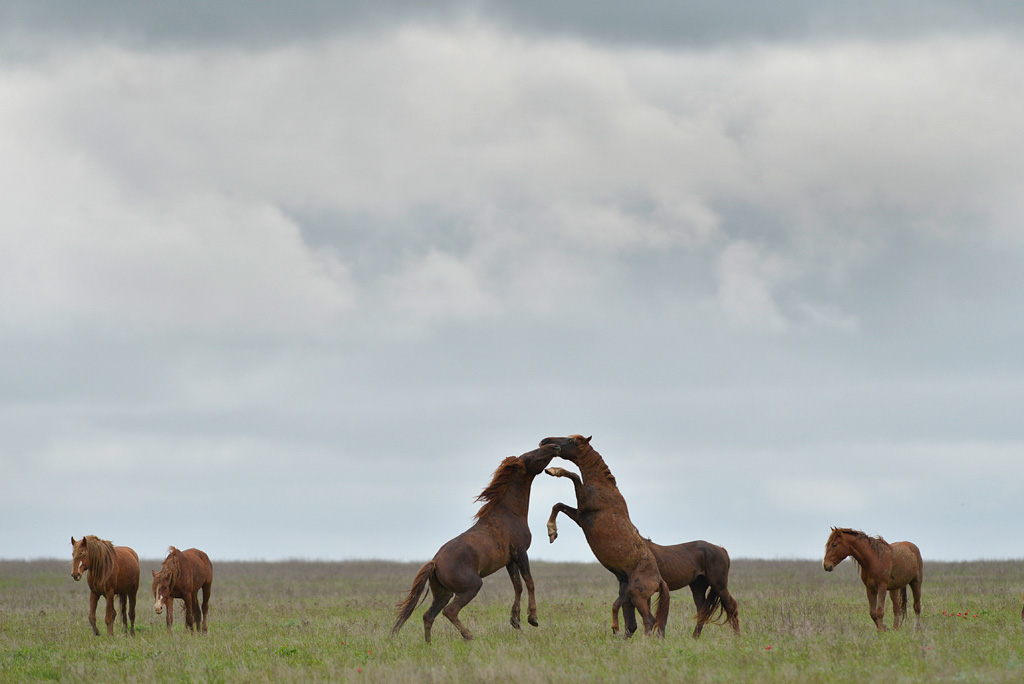
Horses were domesticated on the Pontic-Caspian steppe.

The economy of the Abashevo culture was mixed agriculture. Cattle, sheep, pig and goats, as well as other domestic animals were kept. Stone grinders and metal sickles are evidences of agriculture.

Horses were evidently used, inferred by cheek pieces typical of neighboring steppe cultures and Mycenaean Greece. According to Elena Kuzmina (2007) the first controlling of chariots with cheek-pieces can be attributed to the Abashevo and Multi-cordoned ware cultures.

The population of Sintashta derived their stock-breeding from Abashevo. Abashevo cattle was of the Ukrainian Grey type, and this cattle had previously been raised among earlier Neolithic cultures of the Pontic steppe and along the Danube. This type of cattle was later adopted by the Sintashta culture and the Srubnaya culture.

=== Warfare ===
Archaeological evidence suggests that Abashevo society was intensely warlike. Mass graves reveal that inter-tribal battles involved hundreds of warriors of both sides, which indicates a significant degree of inter-regional political integration. Warfare appears to have been more frequent in the late Abashevo period, and it was in this turbulent environment in which the Sintashta culture emerged.

== Linguistics ==
David Anthony assumes that the Abashevo people spoke Pre-Indo-Iranian or Proto-Indo-Iranian, since it is a possible source of Indo-Iranian loanwords in Uralic. The Indo-Iranian characteristic of the Abashevo language is also evidenced in its loanwords in Finnic and Saami.

It probably witnessed a bilingual population undergo a process of assimilation.

== Physical type ==
Physical remains of the Abashevo people has revealed that they were Caucasoids/Europoids with dolichocephalic skulls. Abashevo skulls are very similar to those of the preceding Fatyanovo–Balanovo culture, and the succeeding Sintashta culture, Andronovo culture and Srubnaya culture, while differing from those of the Yamnaya culture, Poltavka culture, Catacomb culture and Potapovka culture, which although being of a similar robust Europoid type, are less dolichocephalic. The physical type of Abashevo, Sintashta, Andronovo and Srubnaya is later observed among the Scythians. (Note: Skulls from Potapovka burials belong to the massive proto-Europoid type and are similar to the earlier Catacomb and genetically follow the Timber-grave and west Andronovo, but differ from Abashevo.) (Note: "[M]assive broad-faced proto-Europoid type is a trait of post-Mariupol’ cultures, Sredniy Stog, as well as the Pit-grave culture of the Dnieper’s left bank, the Donets, and Don... During the period of the Timber-grave culture the population of the Ukraine was represented by the medium type between the dolichocephalous narrow-faced population of the Multi-roller Ware culture (Babino) and the more massive broad-faced population of the Timber-grave culture of the Volga region... The anthropological data confirm the existence of an impetus from the Volga region to the Ukraine in the formation of the Timber-grave culture. During the Belozerka stage the dolichocranial narrow-faced type became the prevalent one. A close affinity among the skulls of the Timber-grave, Belozerka, and Scythian cultures of the Pontic steppes, on the one hand, and of the same cultures of the forest-steppe region, on the other, has been shown... This proves the genetical continuity between the Iranian-speeking Scythian population and the previous Timber-grave culture population in the Ukraine... The heir of the Neolithic Dnieper-Donets and Sredniy Stog cultures was the Pit-grave culture. Its population possessed distinct Europoid features, was tall, with massive skulls... The tribes of the Abashevo culture appear in the forest-steppe zone, almost simultaneously with the Poltavka culture. The Abashevans are marked by dolichocephaly and narrow faces. This population had its roots in the Balanovo and Fatyanovo cultures on the Middle Volga, and in Central Europe... [T]he early Timber-grave culture (the Potapovka) population was the result of the mixing of different components. One type was massive, and its predecessor was the Pit-grave-Poltavka type. The second type was a dolichocephalous Europoid type genetically related to the Sintashta population... One more participant of the ethno-cultural processes in the steppes was that of the tribes of the Pokrovskiy type. They were dolichocephalous narrow-faced Europoids akin to the Abashevans and different from the Potapovkans... The majority of Timber-grave culture skulls are dolichocranic with middle-broad faces. They evidence the significant role of Pit-grave and Poltavka components in the Timber-grave culture population... One may assume a genetic connection between the populations of the Timber-grave culture of the Urals region and the Alakul’ culture of the Urals and West Kazakhstan belonging to a dolichocephalous narrow-face type with the population of the Sintashta culture... [T]he western part of the Andronovo culture population belongs to the dolichocranic type akin to that of the Timber-grave culture.)

== Successors ==
The Abashevo culture is closely associated with the Sintashta culture, and must have played a role in its origin. The Sintashta culture however differs from the Abashevo culture through having fortified settlements, conducting large-scale animal sacrifices, and in its metal types and ornaments.

Continuity between the Abashevo culture and the later Srubnaya culture has been pointed out. Along with the Potapovka culture, the Abashevo culture is considered an ancestor of the Srubnaya culture. The Potapovka culture itself emerged from the Poltavka culture with influences from the Abashevo culture.

== See also ==
- Bronze Age Europe
- Únětice culture
- Nordic Bronze Age
- Mycenaean Greece
- Ottomány culture
- Gandhara grave culture

== Sources ==
- Anthony, David W. (2007). The Horse, the Wheel, and Language: How Bronze-Age Riders from the Eurasian Steppes Shaped the Modern World. Princeton University Press. ISBN 978-1-4008-3110-4.
- Hasan, Ahmad; Masson, Vadim Mikhailovich [in French] (1992). History of Civilizations of Central Asia. Vol. 1. UNESCO. ISBN 978-92-3-102719-2.
- Koryakova, Ludmila Vladimirovich [in Russian]; Epimakhov, Andrej (2007). The Urals and Western Siberia in the Bronze and Iron Ages. Cambridge World Archaeology. Cambridge University Press. ISBN 978-0-511-26996-7.
- Kuzmina, Elena E. (2007). Mallory, J. P. (ed.). The Origin of the Indo-Iranians. BRILL. ISBN 978-9004160545.
- Mallory, J. P. (1991). In Search of the Indo-Europeans: Language Archeology and Myth. Thames & Hudson.
- Mallory, J. P.; Adams, Douglas Q. (1997). Encyclopedia of Indo-European Culture. Taylor & Francis. ISBN 1884964982.
