= Indo-Aryan =

Indo-Aryan refers to:

- Indo-Aryan languages
- Indo-Aryan peoples

== See also ==
- Indo-Aryan migrations
- Indo-European
- Indo-Iranians
- Aryan
