= Abashevo, Chuvash Republic =

Abashevo Абашево
- Selo
- Location within Chuvash Republic Location within Russia
- Coordinates: 55°59′N 47°21′E
- Country: Russia
- Region: Chuvash Republic
- District: Cheboksarsky District
- Time zone: [[UTC+3:00]]

Abashevo (Russian: Абашево; Chuvash: Апаш, Apaş) is a rural locality (a selo) and the administrative center of Abashevskoye Rural Settlement of Cheboksarsky District, Chuvash Republic, Russia. The population was 851 as of 2012. There are 9 streets.

== Geography ==
Abashevo is located on the left bank of the Ryksha River, 7 km southeast of Kugesi (the district's administrative centre) by road. Zavrazhnoye is the nearest rural locality.
