= Middle Dnieper culture =

Archaeological culture in Europe

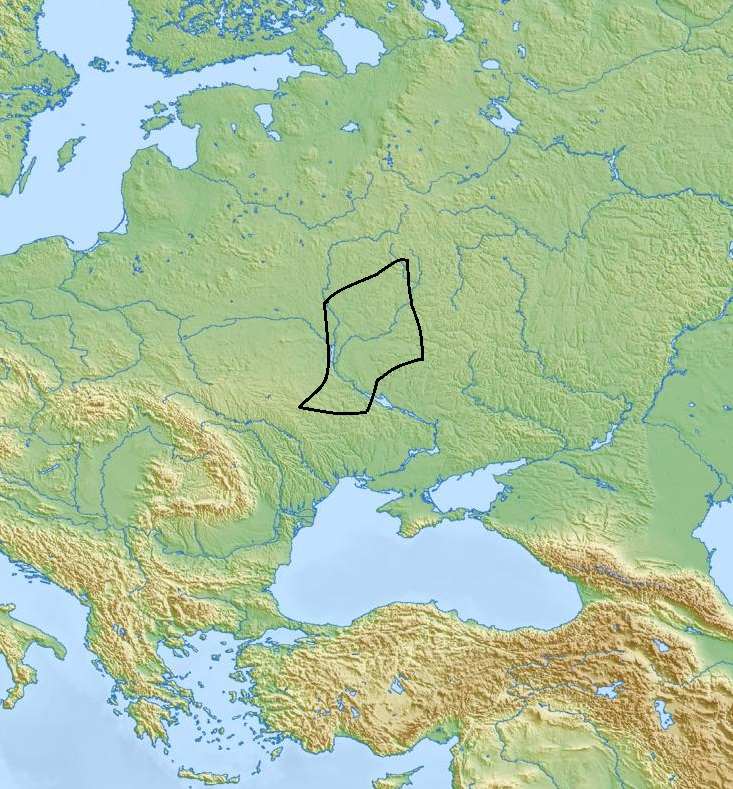
Map of the distribution of the Middle Dnieper culture

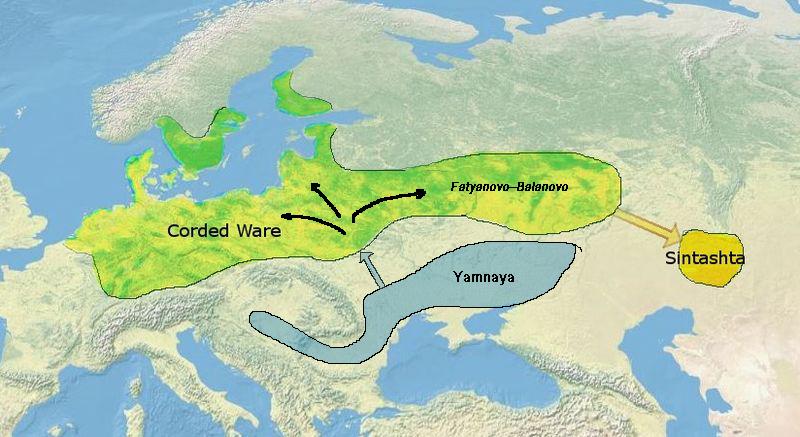
According to Allentoft (2015), the Sintashta culture probably derived at least partially from the Corded Ware culture. Nordqvist and Heyd (2020) confirm this.

The Middle Dnieper culture or the Middle Dnipro culture (Russian: Среднеднепровская культура, romanized: Srednedneprovskaya kul'tura; Ukrainian: Середньодніпро́вська культу́ра, romanized: Serednjodniprovsjka kuljtura; Belarusian: Сярэднедняпроўская культура, romanized: Siaredniedniaproûskaja kuĺtura) is a regional variant of the Corded Ware culture, ca. 2600–1800 BC, in southwestern Russia, northern Ukraine and eastern Belarus.

== Distribution ==
As the name indicates, it was centered on the middle reach of the Dnieper River and is contemporaneous with the latter phase and then a successor to the Yamnaya culture, as well as to the latter phase of the Cucuteni–Trypillia culture.

The Middle Dnieper culture's sites are included in the region of Right Bank Ukraine, from where it expanded outwards, primarily along the Pripyat river to south-east Poland, where it interacted with the Subcarpathian Corded Ware. In Russia, the culture is found in Bryansk, Smolensk, and parts of Kaluga and Oryol oblasts, including a group in the Desna River basin. In Belarus, the culture is attested in the Gomel and Mogilyov regions.

Geographically, the Middle Dnieper culture is directly behind the area occupied by the Globular Amphora culture (south and east), and while commencing a little later and lasting a little longer, it is otherwise contemporaneous with it.

== Characteristics ==
More than 200 sites are attested to, mostly as barrow inhumations under tumuli; some of these burials are secondary depositions into Yamnaya-era kurgans. Grave goods included pottery and stone battle-axes. There is some evidence of cremation in the northerly area. Settlements seem difficult to define; the economy was much like that of the Yamnaya and Corded Ware cultures, semi-to-fully-nomadic pastoralism.

== Ethnicity ==
Within the context of the Kurgan hypothesis of Marija Gimbutas, this culture is a major center for migrations (or invasions, if one prefers) from the Yamnaya culture and its immediate successors into Northern and Central Europe.

It has been argued that the area where the Middle Dnieper culture is situated would have provided a better migration route for steppe tribes along the Pripyat tributary of the Dnieper and perhaps provided the cultural bridge between Yamnaya and Corded Ware cultures. This area has also been a classic invasion route, as seen historically with the armies of the Mongol Golden Horde (moving east to west from the steppes) and Napoleon Bonaparte (moving west to east from Europe).

On the other hand, the Middle-Dnieper culture has been viewed as a contact zone between Yamnaya steppe tribes and occupants of the forest steppe zone, possibly signaling communications between pre-Indo-Iranian speakers and pre-Balto-Slavs as interpreted by an exchange of material goods evident in the archaeological record sans migration.

== See also ==
- Sredny Stog culture
- Milograd culture
- Abashevo culture
