= Encyclopedia of Indo-European Culture =

Archaeological encyclopedia

- Editors: J. P. Mallory, Douglas Q. Adams
- Language: English
- Subject: Indo-European studies
- Genre: Encyclopedia
- Publisher: Fitzroy Dearborn
- Publication date: 1997
- Pages: 829

The Encyclopedia of Indo-European Culture (EIEC) is an encyclopedia of Indo-European studies and the Proto-Indo-Europeans. The encyclopedia was edited by J. P. Mallory and Douglas Q. Adams and published in 1997 by Fitzroy Dearborn. Archaeological articles are written by Mallory, linguistic articles are written by Adams, and include a distinguished Who's Who of 1990s Indo-Europeanists who made contributions as sub-editors. Though it is not a polemic, the work in part extends support to Colin Renfrew's Anatolian hypothesis of Indo-European origins.

== Reviews ==
- Anttila, Raimo (2000). "[review of] JAMES P. MALLORY and DOUGLAS Q. ADAMS, eds., Encyclopedia of Indo-European culture [etc.]". Word. 50 (2): 215–220. doi:10.1080/00437956.1999.11432489.
- Lehmann, Winfred P. (1999). "Encyclopedia of Indo-European culture Ed. by James P. Mallory and Douglas Q. Adams (review)". Language. 75 (1): 154–158. doi:10.1353/lan.1999.0016.
- Vajda, Edward J. (1999). "[review of] James P. Mallory and Douglas Q. Adams, eds. Encyclopedia of Indo-European Culture [etc.]". Canadian Journal of Linguistics/Revue canadienne de linguistique. 44 (3): 320–323. doi:10.1017/S0008413100017424.
- Witczak, Krzystof Tomasz (2003). "[review of] J. P. MALLORY and D. Q. ADAMS (eds.), Encyclopedia of Indo-European Culture [etc.]". Studia Indogermanica Lodziensia. 5: 175–184.

== Bibliography ==
- Mallory, J.P.; Douglas Q. Adams (1997). Encyclopedia of Indo-European Culture. London: Fitzroy Dearborn Publishers. ISBN 978-1-884964-98-5.
