= Elena Efimovna Kuzmina =

Russian archaeologist (1931–2013)

- Born: April 13, 1931
- Died: October 17, 2013 (aged 82)
- Education: Moscow State University
- Known for: Pioneering research on the archaeology of the Indo-Iranians
- Scientific career
- Fields: Archaeology
- Institutions: Moscow State University

Elena Efimovna Kuz'mina (Russian: Еле́на Ефи́мовна Кузьмина́; 13 April 1931 – 17 October 2013) was a Russian archaeologist. She was the chief research officer of the Russian Institute for Cultural Researches. She led 25 archaeological expeditions and participated in over a hundred, mostly in the Eurasian steppe region.

She received her Candidate of Sciences degree in archaeology in 1964 at the Moscow State University, and her Doktor nauk degree in 1988. She was a full professor of archaeology from 1988 to 2013.

She was the head scholar of the Russian Institute for Cultural Research. She was also an academician, member of the Russian Academy of Natural Sciences (1988), Corresponding Fellow of the German Archaeological Institute (1982), member of the Italian Società Iranologica Europea (1996), and of the European Association of South Asian Archaeologists.

In 2009, she won Iran's World Prize for book of the year for her book The Origins of the Indo-Iranians.

== Publications ==
Kuzmina published more than 300 articles and 15 books on the archaeology of the Eurasian Steppes, the origins and migrations of Indo-Iranians, their mythology and arts, and essays in museum policies.

Some of her notable works are:

- "Откуда пришли индоарии" (Whence Came the Indo-Aryans) (Moscow, 1994)
- "Мифология и искусство скифов и бактрийцев" (Mythology and Art of the Scythians and Bactrians) (Moscow, 2002)
- The Origin of the Indo-Iranians (Elena E. Kuz'mina, edited by J. P. Mallory; Brill, 2007)
- The Prehistory of the Silk Road (edited by Victor H. Mair; Philadelphia, 2008)

=== The Origin of the Indo-Iranians ===
The Origin of the Indo-Iranians, which is an updated and expanded version of Whence came the Indo-Iranians?, has been called her "magnum opus" and "the most exhaustive examination to date of Proto-Indo-Iranians," decisively adding her voice to the debate on the origins of Indo-Iranians and, more generally, that of the Indo-Europeans. The thesis presented in the book is that a number of genetically related tribes consolidated around the steppes representing the Andronovo horizon and that, for various reasons, the tribes speaking Iranian languages emerged as the dominant ones among them. Kuzmina presents her case based on extensive archaeological evidence.

== See also ==
- Ihsan Ali
- Raymond Allchin
- Bridget Allchin
