= Douglas Q. Adams =

American linguist

Douglas Quentin Adams is an American linguist, professor of English at the University of Idaho and an Indo-European comparativist. He studied at the University of Chicago, earning PhD in 1972. Adams is an expert on Tocharian and a contributor on this subject to the Encyclopædia Britannica.

He has also co-authored two works on Indo-European culture and languages with J. P. Mallory of the Royal Irish Academy. He is a Linguistics Editor at the Journal of Indo-European Studies, founded by Roger Pearson.

At the University of Idaho, Adams teaches courses on linguistics, and grammar and semantics for the English as a Second Language program.

== Works ==
- Adams, Douglas Q. (1987). Essential modern Greek grammar. New York: Dover Publications. ISBN 0-486-25133-0.
- Adams, Douglas (1988). Tocharian historical phonology and morphology. New Haven, Conn: American Oriental Society. ISBN 0-940490-71-4.
- Mallory, J. P.; Adams, D. Q. (1997). Encyclopedia of Indo-European Culture. London and Chicago: Fitzroy Dearborn Publishers. ISBN 1-884964-98-2.
- Hamp, Eric P.; Adams, Douglas (1997). Festschrift for Eric P. Hamp. Washington, D.C.: Institute for the Study of Man. ISBN 0-941694-57-7.
- Adams, Douglas (2013). A dictionary of Tocharian B. Vol. 1 (2nd ed.). Amsterdam: Rodopi Publishers. p. 964. ISBN 978-9042036710.
- Mallory, J. P.; Adams, D. Q. (2006). The Oxford Introduction to Proto-Indo-European and the Proto-Indo-European World. USA: Oxford University Press. p. 760. ISBN 0-19-929668-5.
