= David W. Anthony =

American anthropologist

Academic background
- Education: University of Pennsylvania

Academic work
- Discipline: Anthropology
- Sub-discipline: Indo-European studies
- Institutions: Hartwick College
- Main interests: Domestication of the horse, Indo-European migrations
- Notable works: The Horse, the Wheel, and Language (2007)
- Notable ideas: Kurgan hypothesis

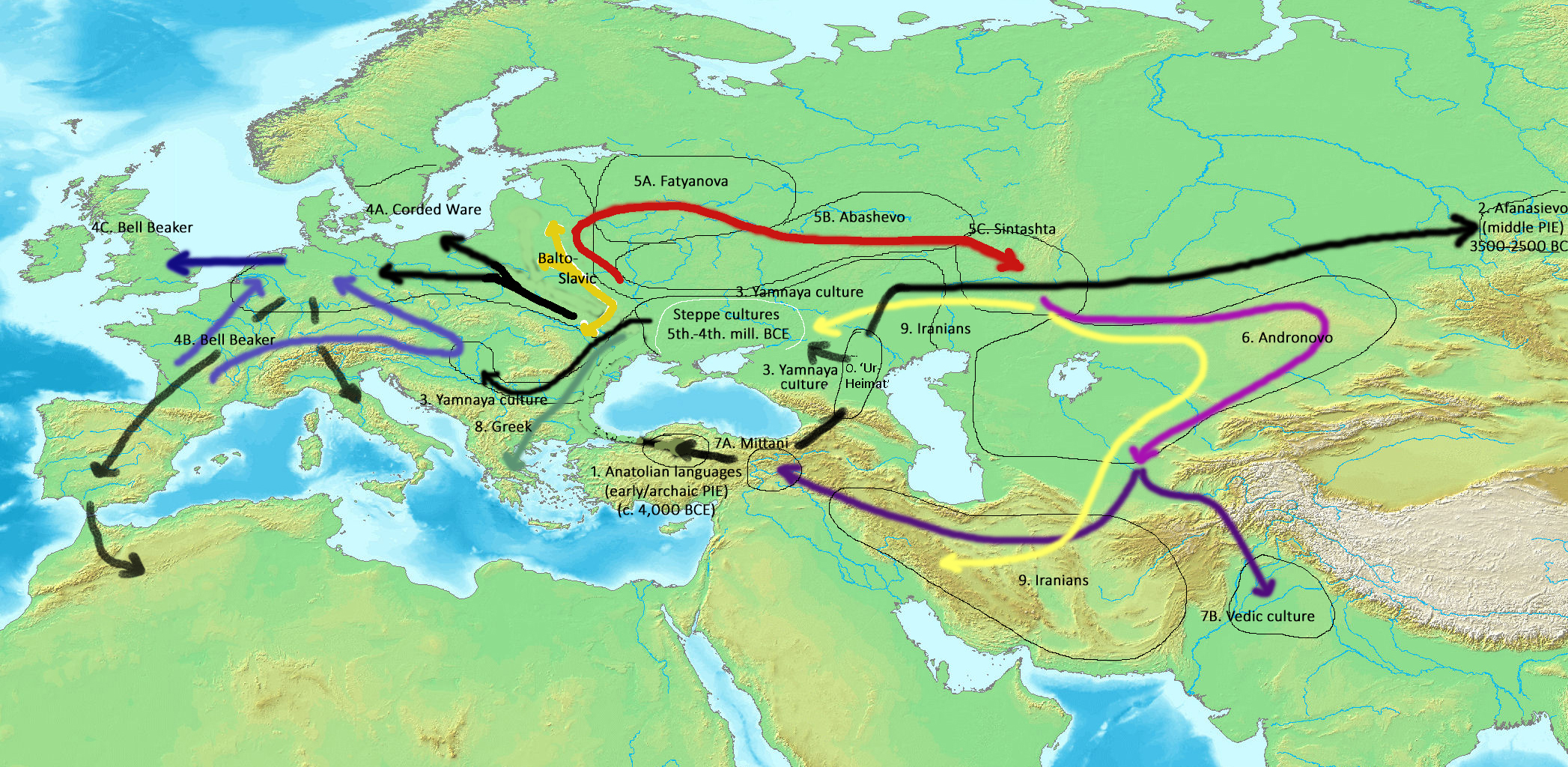
Scheme of Indo-European language dispersals from c. 4000 to 1000 BCE according to the widely held Kurgan hypothesis: Center: Steppe cultures; 0 'Ur-Heimat'; 1 (black): Anatolian languages (archaic PIE); 2 (black): Afanasievo culture (early PIE); 3 (black): Yamnaya culture expansion (Pontic-Caspian steppe, Danube Valley; late PIE); 4A (black): Western Corded Ware; 4B-C (blue and dark blue): Bell Beaker; adopted by Indo-European speakers; 5A-B (red): Eastern Corded ware; 5C (red): Sintashta (proto-Indo-Iranian); 6 (magenta): Andronovo; 7A (purple): Indo-Aryans (Mittani); 7B (purple): Indo-Aryans (India); [NN] (dark yellow): proto-Balto-Slavic; 8 (grey): Greek; 9 (yellow): Iranians; Not drawn are Armenian, expanding from Catacomb culture into the South Caucasus.

David W. Anthony is an American anthropologist who is Professor Emeritus of Anthropology at Hartwick College. He specializes in the domestication of the horse and Indo-European migrations, and has proposed a revised version of the Kurgan hypothesis. Anthony is well known for his award-winning book The Horse, the Wheel, and Language (2007).

== Career ==
Anthony received a Ph.D. in anthropology from the University of Pennsylvania.

Anthony has been a Professor of Anthropology at Hartwick College since 1987. While at Hartwick, he was also the curator of Anthropology for the Yager Museum of Art & Culture on the campus of Hartwick College in Oneonta, New York. According to Princeton University Press, "he has conducted extensive archaeological fieldwork in Ukraine, Russia, and Kazakhstan." Anthony has been Archaeology Editor of the Journal of Indo-European Studies.

=== Domestication of the horse ===
One of his areas of research has been the domestication of the horse. In 2019, his work was featured in an episode of Nova that discussed the theories of how this process occurred.

=== Danubian culture ===
From November 2009 until April 2010, Anthony curated a museum exhibition of the ancient Danubian culture that existed between 5000BC and 3500BC. In an interview he remarked that the residents knew how to smelt copper and were excellent goldsmiths and potters. This followed the release of his book The Lost World Of Old Europe: The Danube Valley, 5000 - 3500 BC.

=== Indo-European migrations ===
His 2007 book The Horse, the Wheel, and Language proposes a revised version of the Steppe theory, which sees the Pontic-Caspian steppe as the 'Ur-Heimat' of the Indo-European languages. The steppe theory was first formulated by Otto Schrader (1883) and V. Gordon Childe (1926), then systematized in the 1950s by Marija Gimbutas, who used the term to group various prehistoric cultures, including the Yamnaya (or Pit Grave) culture and its predecessors. Since the 2000s, Anthony instead uses the core Yamnaya culture and its relationship with other cultures as a point of reference.

In publications since 2019 Anthony has argued that the 'Ur-Heimat' of the IE-languages, the socalled Indo-Anatolian language, emerged between the lower Volga Basin and the Caucasus. From there, archaic and early IE-speakers migrated to Anatolia (Anatolian languages); South Siberia (Afanasievo culture); and the Ukrainian steppes, where the Yamnaya culture developed. Already in his 2006 publication argued for the Yamnaya-culture as the source for almost all Indo-European languages; subsequent DNA-research confirmed mass-migrations to the west between 3000-2500, with the Yamnaya-culture migrants morphing into the Corded ware culture and Bell Beaker culture; and Indo-Aryan migrations into South Asia which brought the Indo-Aryan languages there.

== Works ==
According to the uncurated ResearchGate website, Anthony has published at least 54 research articles.

=== Books ===
- The Horse, the Wheel and Language: How Bronze-Age Riders from the Eurasian Steppes Shaped the Modern World (2007)
- The Lost World Of Old Europe: The Danube Valley, 5000 - 3500 BC (2009)
- A Bronze Age Landscape in the Russian Steppes: The Samara Valley Project (2016, co-editor)

=== Articles ===
- Anthony, David (1995). "Nazi and eco-feminist prehistories: ideology and empiricism in Indo-European archaeology". Nationalism, politics, and the practice of archaeology. Cambridge: Cambridge University Press. ISBN 978-0-521-55839-6.
- Anthony, David; Ringe, Don (2015), "The Indo-European Homeland from Linguistic and Archaeological Perspectives", Annual Review of Linguistics, 1: 199–219, doi:10.1146/annurev-linguist-030514-124812
- Anthony, David (2017), "Archaeology and Language: Why Archaeologists Care About the Indo-European Problem", in Crabtree, P. J.; Bogucki, P. (eds.), European Archaeology as Anthropology: Essays in Memory of Bernard Wailes, University of Pennsylvania Press
- Anthony, D. W. (2019), "Archaeology, Genetics, and Language in the Steppes: A Comment on Bomhard", Journal of Indo-European Studies, pp. 1–23
- Anthony, David (2020), "Ancient DNA, Mating Networks, and the Anatolian Split", in Serangeli, Matilde; Olander, Thomas (eds.), Dispersals and Diversification: Linguistic and Archaeological Perspectives on the Early Stages of Indo-European, Brill

=== Co-author ===
- Lazaridis, Iosif; Haak, Wolfgang; Patterson, Nick; Anthony, David; Reich, David (2015), "Massive migration from the steppe is a source for Indo-European languages in Europe. Supplementary Information 11. Relevance of ancient DNA to the problem of Indo-European language dispersals", Nature, 522 (7555): 207–211, arXiv:1502.02783, Bibcode:2015Natur.522..207H, doi:10.1038/nature14317, PMC 5048219, PMID 25731166
- Lazaridis, Josif; Patterson, Nick; Anthony, David (2025). "The genetic origin of the Indo-Europeans" (PDF). Nature. 639: 132–142. doi:10.1038/s41586-024-08531-5.

=== Filmography ===
Anthony has appeared as a relator of history in works such as:

- How the Silk Road Made the World (2019, NHNZ)
- First Horse Warriors (2019, NOVA)

== See also ==
- Edgar C. Polomé
- J. P. Mallory
