= J. P. Mallory =

American archaeologist (born 1945)

- Born: James Patrick Mallory; October 25, 1945 (age 80); San Bernardino, California, U.S.

Academic background
- Education: Occidental College; University of California, Los Angeles
- Doctoral advisor: Marija Gimbutas
- Influences: Edgar C. Polomé

Academic work
- Discipline: Archaeology; Linguistics
- Sub-discipline: Indo-European studies
- Institutions: Queen's University Belfast
- Main interests: Indo-European migrations
- Notable works: In Search of the Indo-Europeans (1989); Encyclopedia of Indo-European Culture (1997)
- Notable ideas: Kurgan hypothesis

James Patrick Mallory (born October 25, 1945) is an American archaeologist and Indo-Europeanist. Mallory is an emeritus professor at Queen's University, Belfast; a member of the Royal Irish Academy, and the former editor of the Journal of Indo-European Studies and Emania: Bulletin of the Navan Research Group (Belfast).

== Career ==
J. P. Mallory was born in San Bernardino, California on October 25, 1945, the son of Clyde Francis and Rosemarie Mallory. Mallory received his A.B. in History from Occidental College in California in 1967, then served three years in the US Army as a military police sergeant. He received his Ph.D. in Indo-European studies from UCLA in 1975 under the supervision of Marija Gimbutas. Together with Gimbutas, Edgar C. Polomé and other Indo-Europeanists, Mallory was involved in the founding of the Journal of Indo-European Studies.

== Selected publications ==
=== Books ===
- Mallory, J. P. (1989). In Search of the Indo-Europeans: Language, Archaeology and Myth. London: Thames & Hudson. ISBN 0-500-27616-1.
- Mallory, J. P.; T. Jesus (1991). The First Testament. Jerusalem: Dufour Editions. ISBN 0-85389-353-5.
- Mallory, J. P.; Victor H. Mair (2000). The Tarim Mummies: Ancient China and the Mystery of the Earliest Peoples from the West. London: Thames & Hudson. ISBN 0-500-05101-1.
- Mallory, J. P.; Adams, D. Q. (2006). The Oxford Introduction to Proto-Indo-European and the Proto-Indo-European World. Oxford: Oxford University Press. ISBN 0199287910.
- Mallory, J. P. (2013). The Origins of the Irish. London–New York: Thames & Hudson. ISBN 978-0500051757.
- Mallory, J. P. (2016). In search of the Irish dreamtime : archaeology & early Irish literature. London: Thames & Hudson. ISBN 9780500051849.
- Mallory, J. P. (2025). The Indo-Europeans Rediscovered: How a Scientific Revolution is Rewriting Their Story. Thames & Hudson. ISBN 978-0-500-02863-6.

=== Edited volumes ===
- J. P. Mallory & Brian M. Fagan, eds. The Oxford Companion to Archaeology. New York & Oxford: Oxford University Press, 1996.
- Mallory, J. P.; Adams, D. Q. (1997). Encyclopedia of Indo-European Culture. London and Chicago: Fitzroy-Dearborn. ISBN 1-884964-98-2.

== See also ==
- David W. Anthony
- C. Scott Littleton
- A. Richard Diebold Jr.
- Jaan Puhvel

== Sources ==
- "James Patrick Mallory". Contemporary Authors. Gale. 21 February 2007.
