= History of human settlement in the Ural Mountains =

From the Arctic Ocean in the north to the Ural River and northwestern Kazakhstan

History of the Ural Mountains
Human settlement
- Indo-European migrations

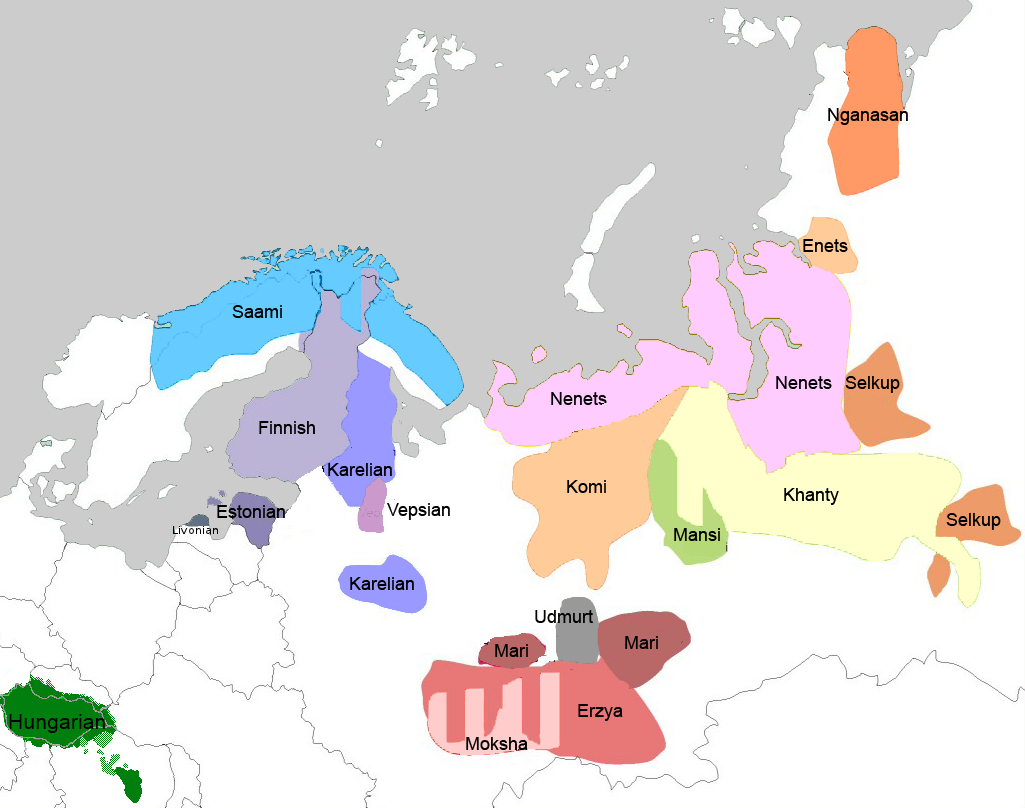
- Current distribution of the Uralic languages

Prehistory
- Paleo Humans: Homo neanderthalensis Modern humans

Northern and Central Ural
- Proto-Uralic homeland: Komi, Udmurts, Khants, Mansi, Samoyeds, Nenets,

Southern Ural
- Indo-European migrations Nomadic migration Settled tribes: Andronovo culture, Sintashta culture Scythians, Sarmatians Huns, Avars, Slavs, Bulgars, Avars-Warhonits, Turks of Ashina, Pechenegs, Guzs, Hungarians-Magyars, Kipchaks, Mongols, Golden Horde, Tyurks, Bashkirs, Volga Tatars

The Ural Mountains extend from the Arctic Ocean in the north to the Ural River and northwestern Kazakhstan in the south over a distance of 1,500 mi (2,400 km), the boundary between Europe and Asia. Human occupation begins in the Paleolithic and continues to this day.

The earliest presence is documented for the Homo neanderthalensis. Although no Neanderthal fossils were ever discovered, stone tools found at Byzovaya, that date to 33,000 years ago are attributed to the Mousterian culture.

Indigenous people, that migrated in the prehistoric era spoke languages of the Uralic and Turkic language families, such as the Komi, Udmurts, Khants, Mansi; Samoyeds – Nenets; Tyurks – Bashkirs and Volga Tatars. The name "Uralic" derives from the fact that areas where these languages are spoken spread on both sides of the Ural Mountains. Also, the original homeland (Urheimat) is commonly hypothesized to lie in the vicinity of the Urals. Proto-Uralic is the reconstructed language ancestral to the Uralic language family. The language was originally spoken in a small area about 7,000 to 2,000 years BCE (estimates vary), and expanded to differentiated proto-languages. The exact location of the area or Urheimat is not known and various strongly differing proposals have been advocated, but the vicinity of the Ural Mountains is usually assumed.

Indo-European settlers of the Southern Ural region arrive during the Bronze Age and the middle of the first millennium BCE. Colonization by the Russian Empire including Ukrainians, Germans and other peoples begins during the 16th century.

== Prehistory ==
Earliest finds are Mousterian stone tools from 33,000 years ago. Upper Paleolithic rock paintings and drawings of the Kapova Cave, Burzyansky District of Bashkortostan in the southern Ural Mountains are 16,000 years old. Artwork comparison suggests a commonality of cultural processes from the Atlantic to the Ural in the Paleolithic era. Identified are more than 50 drawings by S. Lyahnitskogo of the Russian Geological Institute and the Russian Geographical Society. Drawings are executed with ochre, natural pigments mixed with animal fat, depicting mammoths, horses and other animals, complex characters and anthropomorphic figures.

== Bronze Age ==
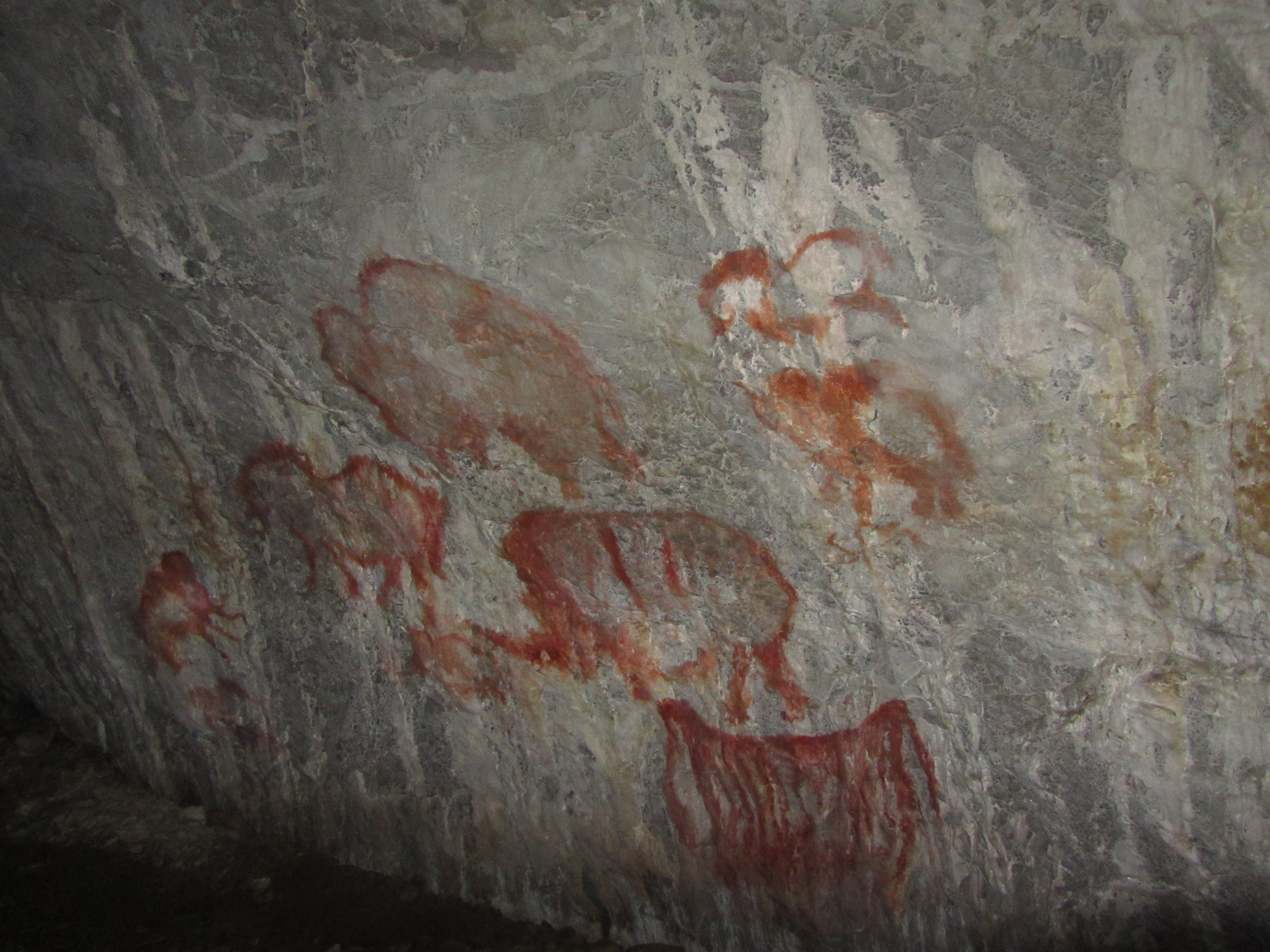
Kapova Cave paintings

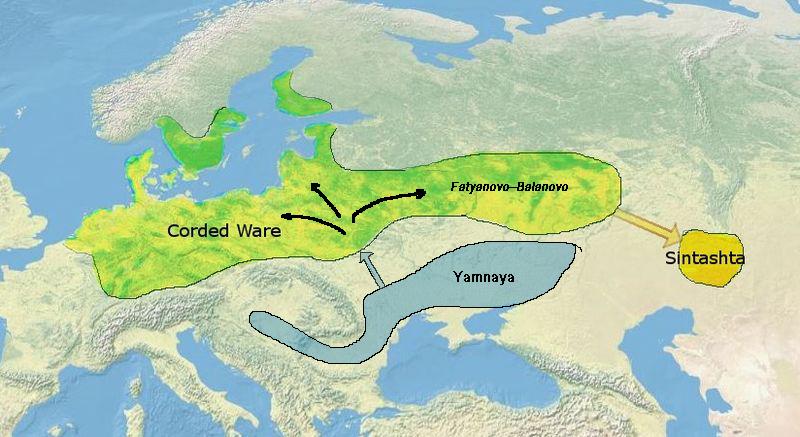
The Sintashta culture probably derived at least partially from the Corded Ware Culture

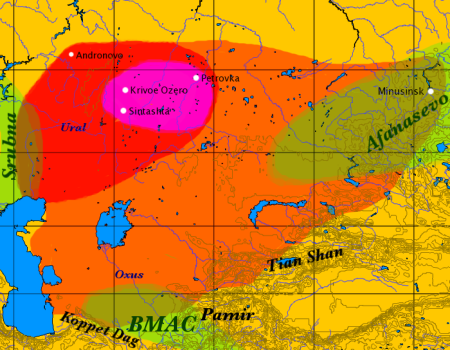
Range of the Andronovo culture

Indo-European Bronze Age cultures have converged on the southern Ural region:

Culture	Era	Features
The Sredny Stog culture	5,000 BCE	is a pre-Kurgan archaeological culture of the 5th millennium BCE.
The Yamna culture	3,500 to 2,300 BCE	or Yamnaya culture, also called Pit Grave Culture and Ochre Grave Culture was a late Copper Age/early Bronze Age culture of the Southern Bug/Dniester/Ural region (the Pontic steppe)
The Poltavka culture	2,700 to 2,100 BCE	an early to middle Bronze Age archaeological culture of the middle Volga from about where the Don-Volga canal begins up to the Samara bend, with an easterly extension north of present Kazakhstan along the Samara River valley to somewhat west of Orenburg
The Abashevo culture	2,500 to 1,900 BCE	is a later Bronze Age archaeological culture found in the valleys of the Volga and Kama River north of the Samara bend and into the southern Ural Mountains.
The Sintashta culture	2,100 to 1,800 BCE	also known as the Sintashta-Petrovka culture or Sintashta-Arkaim culture is a Bronze Age archaeological culture of the northern Eurasian steppe on the borders of Eastern Europe and Central Asia
The Andronovo culture	2,000 to 900 BCE	is a collection of similar local Bronze Age cultures that flourished in western Siberia and the west Asiatic steppe.

=== Andronovo culture ===
Trade of the prestigious bronze artifacts from Lake Baikal to the Mycenaean world in the West via Ural waterways correlated with the development of the Southern Ural proto-urban civilization from Arkaim via Sintashta to Andronovo culture.

- Flat-bottomed, well smoothed pottery decorated with geometric patterns. Intensive copper and bronze metallurgy with distinctive curved bronze knives and twisted earrings.
- Pit-houses were partly dug into the ground (semi-subterranean), with deep storage pits and corridor-shaped exits. Dwellings were spacious, between 80 m^{2} (860 sq ft) and 300 m^{2} (3,200 sq ft), constructed on two rows either in a semi-circular or rectangular plan. They were usually aligned overlooking riverbanks.
- Burials in underground timber or stone chambers inside round or rectangular kurgans. The bodies were accompanied by sacrificed animals (mostly horses and dogs), chariots, cheek pieces, weapons, pottery and jewellery.

== Iron Age ==
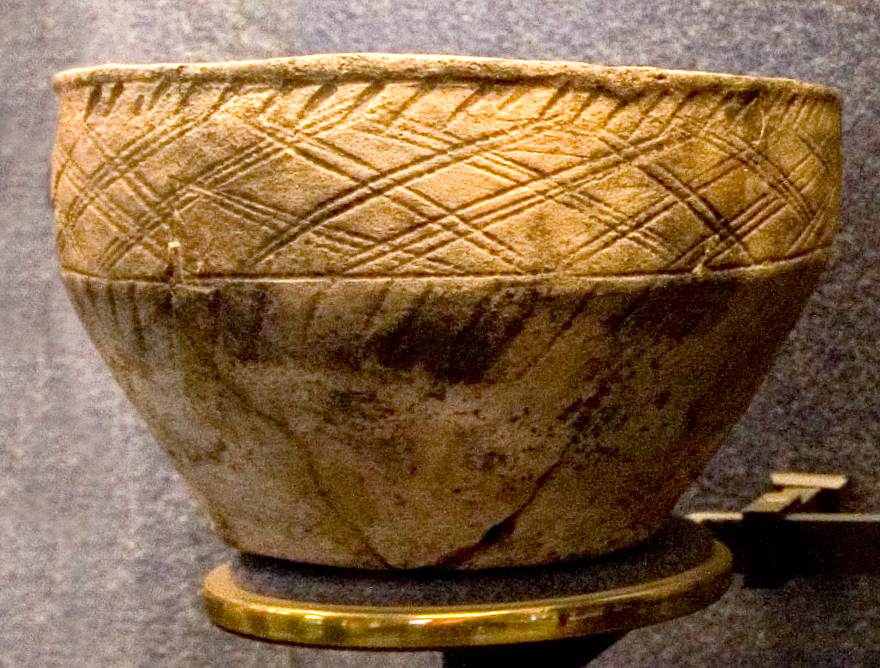
Srubna culture vessel

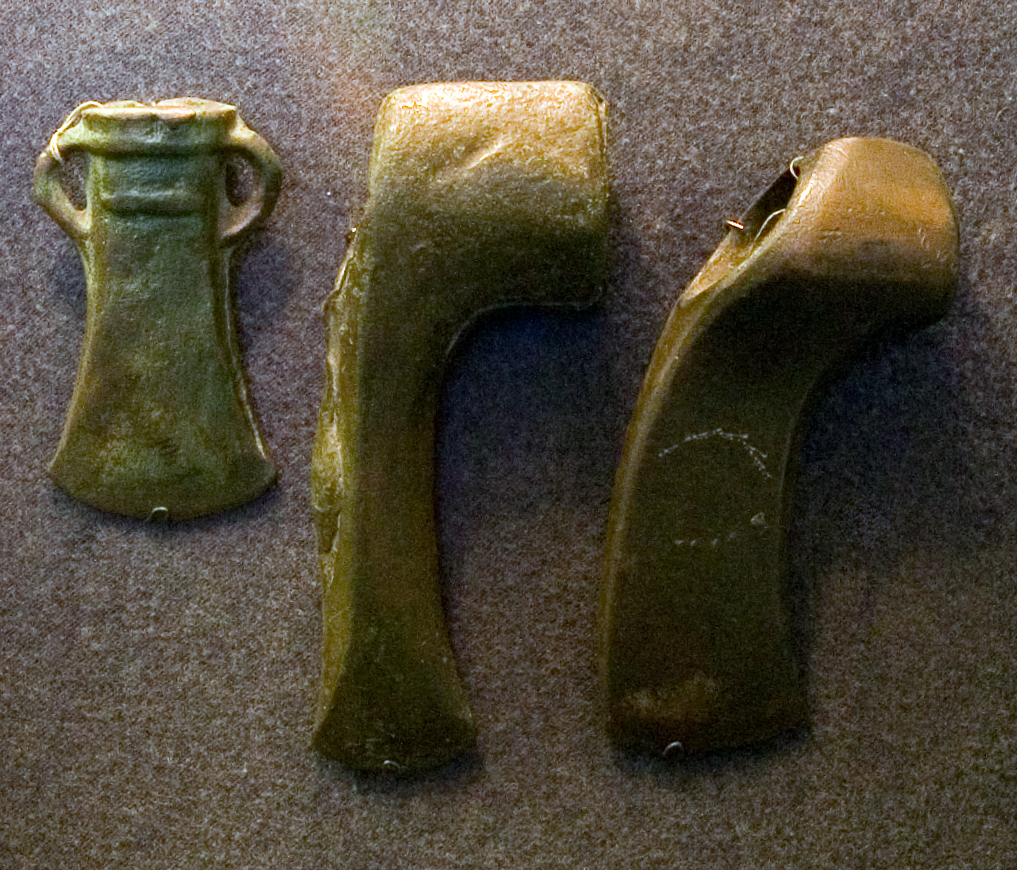
Srubna culture weapons

Ugric, Samoyedic peoples and other peoples had by the second millennium BCE accomplished settlement consolidation of the Middle Ural and Northern Ural according to the Proto-Uralic homeland hypotheses.

By the second millennium BCE Ural had become a source for resources in North Asia. In the Southern Ural the Andronovo culture and Srubna culture were succeeded by the Scythians and Sarmatians.

A study on DNA variation among ancient Europeans found that, of the six samples extracted from Srubna culture sites for whom a Y-DNA haplogroup could be tested, all belonged to haplogroup R1a, and four of them to subclade R1a-Z93, which is common among modern-day Indo-Iranians.

Authors of classical antiquity developed the concept of the Riphean Mountains – an area of which the location is uncertain. The Riphean Mountains referred to the Ural Mountains.

The Ural was considered the boundary between two worlds: civilized Europe and distant, "mysterious" Asia; where the world's civilizations converge: Eurasia.

By the early Common Era, great Migrations of nomads from the east – Huns, Avars, Slavs, and Bulgars. via the Ural steppes ascended into Eastern Europe and Central Europe significantly influencing the indigenous peoples of the southern Ural region – the Bashkirs and Bulgars.

== Middle Ages ==
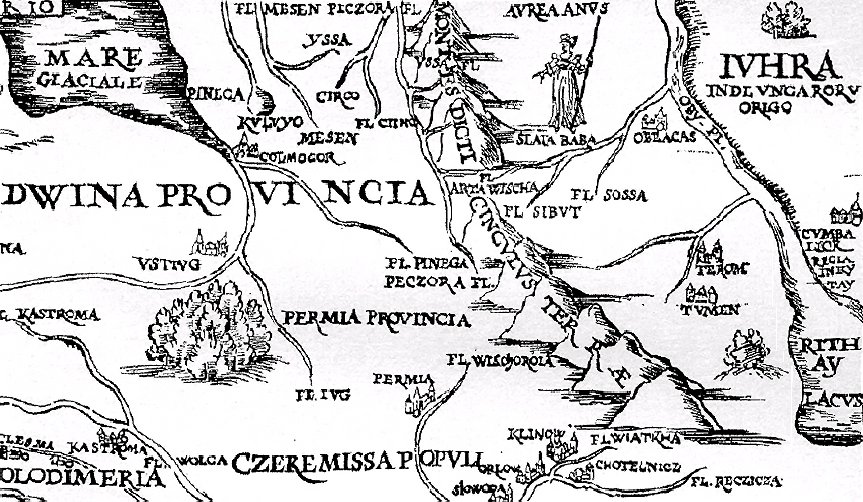
Ural in the fragment of von Herberstein's map

Complex archaeological cultures appeared in the Urals during the Middle Ages, characterized by ethnic descendants as the Sarmatians and Huns. At the same time, the ancestors of the Hungarians – ancient Magyars, (Kushnarenkovo and Karayakupovo archaeological cultures), and ancestors of the Bashkirs – ancient Badzhgards (Turbasli archaeological culture) formed in the Southern Ural. The Southern Ural was the legendary birthplace of Great Hungary (Magna Hungaria) and the country of the Bashkirs – the Badzhgard (Bashkurd).

=== Migration period ===
The migrations of Avars-Warhonits, Turks of Ashina, the Pechenegs, the Guzs, the Hungarians-Magyars, and Kipchaks nomads from the Southern Ural region or passing through the Southern Ural towards the west and Central Europe began during the early medieval period.

The Northern and Middle Ural maintains a continuous population and economy – Khants, Udmurts, Komi, Nenets, Mansi, Fins, etc. resume their semi-Neolithic lifestyle.

Bashkirs and Turkic people are the new indigenous people of the Southern Ural region. But the descendants of the Bulgars from Volga and Ural there are mostly modern Volga Tatars, Chuvash and part of Bashkirs. The hordes of Mongols arrive during the 13th century, followed by the Jochi Ulus, the Golden Horde and the Nogai Horde.

== Colonization period ==
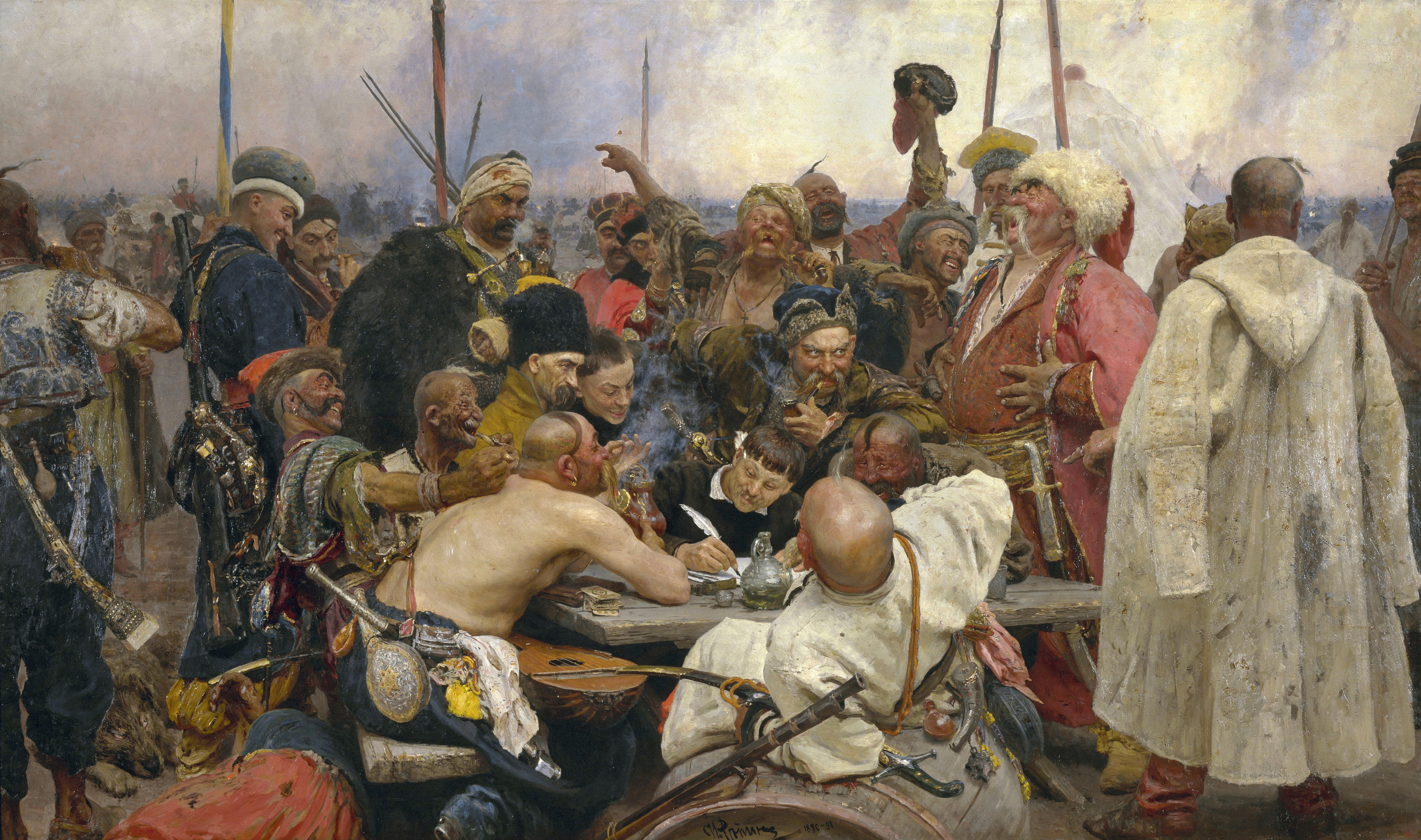
"Zaporozhian Cossacks write to the Sultan of Turkey" by Ilya Repin

Known to medieval Russians as the Stone Belt, the Urals were reached in the early 12th century by colonists and fur traders from Novgorod. Colonization developed rapidly in the late 16th century. The first iron works were established in the 1630s, and metallurgy was encouraged by Peter the Great. In the late 18th and early 19th centuries, the Ural area was a major iron producer, but its relative importance declined in the late 19th century.

Cossacks settled in the Southern Ural along the river Yaik during the colonial period. The Bashkir wars against the Tsarist autocratic regime and the colonizers took up residence in the Ural. The last major uprising was associated with the name of Don Cossack – Yemelyan Pugachev and his companions – Salavat Yulaev.

== Modern era ==
Under the first two Five-Year Plans (1929–39), the industrial development of the Urals was based on Ural iron ore and coking coal shipped by rail from the Kuznetsk Basin. During World War II, industries were transplanted from European USSR to the Urals, strategically situated in the heart of the USSR. Since the war, coking coal from the Qaraghandy Basin, Kuznetsk coal, and hydroelectric power have supported the metallurgical industry, which has been expanded.

The Urals industrial area (c.290,000 sq mi/751,100 km^{2}), a major Russia metallurgical region, is in the central and south Urals and the adjacent lowlands. Industrial centers are found at Yekaterinburg, Magnitogorsk, Chelyabinsk, Perm, Berezniki, Nizhni Tagil, Orsk, Orenburg, Ufa, and Zlatoust.

Boris Yeltsin is quoted as saying, "History decreed that on the threshold of the third millennium, in spite of the significantly depleted natural resources, Ural continues to play an important role in the fate of the Russian Federation. From here we went many democratic initiatives of our time. Ural nominated from among themselves the leaders of the reform and the first President of Russia."

== Bibliography ==
- Ian Blanchard (2001). Mining, Metallurgy and Minting in the Middle Ages: Asiatic supremacy, 425–1125. Franz Steiner Verlag. pp. 324–. ISBN 978-3-515-07958-7.
