= Petrovka (archaeological site) =

Bronze Age archaeological site in Kazakhstan

Coordinates: 54°17′0″N 68°15′0″E

Petrovka is an archaeological site near the village of the same name in Zhambyl District, Kazakhstan, on the Ishim River. It comprises the remains of a 2nd millennium BC fortified settlement and, along with the similar site of Sintashta, is the type site of the Bronze Age Sintashta-Petrovka culture.
