= Russian Zoroastrianism =

Overview of the Zoroastrian movement in the Russian Federation

Blagovery (from Russian: Благоверие, romanized: Blagoverie, lit. 'Good Faith') or Russian Zoroastrianism is a branch of Zoroastrianism practised in Russia. It emerged in the 1990s under the influence of Pavel P. Globa, an astrologist, in Saint Petersburg, as an independent movement from usually endogamous Iranian Zoroastrians. In the 2000s, it was joined by another community in Moscow, initiated by the Iranian priest Kamran Jamshidi. The movement has close ties with Rodnovery (Slavic Neopaganism).

== History ==
Zoroastrianism emerged as a public entity in Russia in the 1990s, founded by Russians themselves despite the normally endogamic essence of the traditional Zoroastrian communities existing in Iran and India. The first Zoroastrian organisation, the "Avestan School of Astrology" (shortened "Asha", which, in the oldest texts known as Arta, is the Persian word defining the agency of cosmic harmony), was established by Pavel Pavlovich Globa (1953–) in the early 1990s, and opened dozens of branches in and outside of Russia. Globa had been teaching Avestan astrology since the 1970s, and in the 1990s he had become a nationally acknowledged expert on the subject. Globa presents himself as the heir of a lineage of Zurvanism (the type of Zoroastrianism that regards Zurvan, i.e. "Time" and "Whole", as the supreme God) from north-west Iran, allegedly transmitted through his great-grandmother and his maternal grandfather Ivan N. Gantimurov. Some of Globa's pupils were initiated by him into a priesthood (khorbad).

In 1994 the "Zoroastrian Community of Saint Petersburg" was established by Globa's followers and officially registered. The organisation publishes the magazine Mitra and the newsletter Tiri. The Zoroastrianism that they propose is a consciously mimetic appropriation of the religion as it is practised among traditional Zoroastrian communities. This recreation involves significant changes; for instance the cords that are worn by initiates around their waist are not white woollen cords as in the original tradition, but are three-coloured cords—yellow, red and blue—symbolising, according to Globa, the three colours of Zurvan.

Since 2001, the priest of Iranian origins Kamran Jamshidi initiated new Avestan astrologers in Minsk, and Russia became a mission field for them. Tensions arose as Jamshidi's initiates challenged the authority of Globa. Under the influence of these new missionaries, another organisation was founded in Moscow in the year 2005, the "Russian Anjoman" (Русский Анджоман; anjoman is a Persian word meaning "assembly"). They use the Russian term "Blagovery" (Благоверие, Blagoverie, 'Good Faith') to define Zoroastrianism.

== Relations with Rodnovers and Roerichians ==
Russian Zoroastrian communities, whether belonging to the Peterburger or Muscovite movements, emphasise that Zoroastrianism has Russian origins, and traces of it have been preserved in Slavic folklore. This parallels the discourse of Rodnovery (Slavic Neopaganism), and one of the early Rodnover ideologues, Anatoly Ivanov, defined his views as "Zoroastrian" and "Avestan". In 1981, Ivanov even published the anti-Christian text entitled Zarathustra Did Not Speak Thus: The Basics of the Aryan Worldview, inspired by Nietzsche's Thus Spoke Zarathustra, wherein Ivanov says that Zoroastrianism should be adopted as a new paradigm for humanity and discusses the eschatology of the Saoshyant. Zoroastrianism has been described by the scholars Michael Stausberg and Anna Tessmann as a "permanent discussion topic" within the Rodnover community.

As it is the case for Rodnovers and Roerichians, the site of Arkaim has great importance for Russian Zoroastrians/Blagovers, since it is believed that the "Aryan prophet" Zoroaster was born and lived there. According to these movements, the southern Ural region of Russia was a centre of irradiation of all Vedic knowledge. The discovery of Arkaim reinvigorated the academic debate about the original homeland of the Indo-Europeans, seemingly confirming its location in central Eurasia. Arkaim and the broader archaeological region have been presented as the "land of the Aryans", the centre of a statehood of a monarchical type, and ultimately the model for a new spiritual civilisation harmonised with the universe. Agencies related to the Russian Orthodox Church have been critical of such activities revolving around Arkaim's archaeology.,

Arkaim is officially designated as a "national and spiritual shrine" of Russia. The Russian president Vladimir Putin visited the site in 2005, meeting in person with the chief archaeologist Gennady Zdanovich. The visit received much attention from Russian media. They presented Arkaim as the "homeland of the majority of contemporary people in Asia, and, partly, Europe". Nationalists called Arkaim the "city of Russian glory" and the "most ancient Slavic-Aryan town". Zdanovich reportedly presented Arkaim to the president as a possible "national idea of Russia", a new idea of civilisation which the scholar Victor Shnirelman calls the "Russian idea". In 2007, during an interview with Iranian state media, Putin himself declared that Zoroastrianism originated in the southern part of the Ural region, and that it is the base of all major world religious systems.

== See also ==
- Zoroastrianism
- Slavic Native Faith
  - Slavic Native Faith in Russia
- Proto-Indo-Iranian religion
  - Historical Vedic religion
  - Ancient Iranian religion
