= Country of Towns =

Archaeological area in southern Ural region

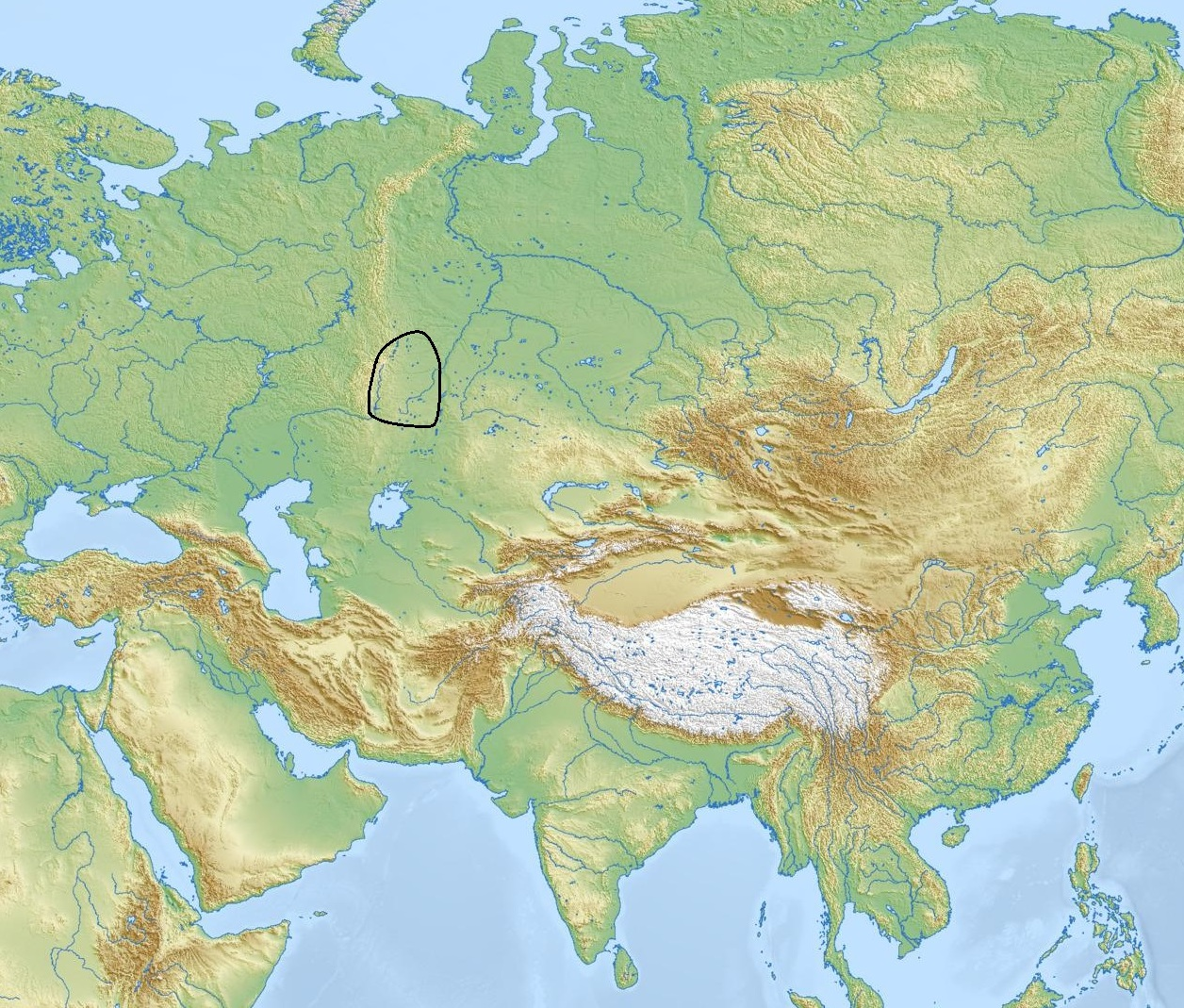
Sintashta culture map

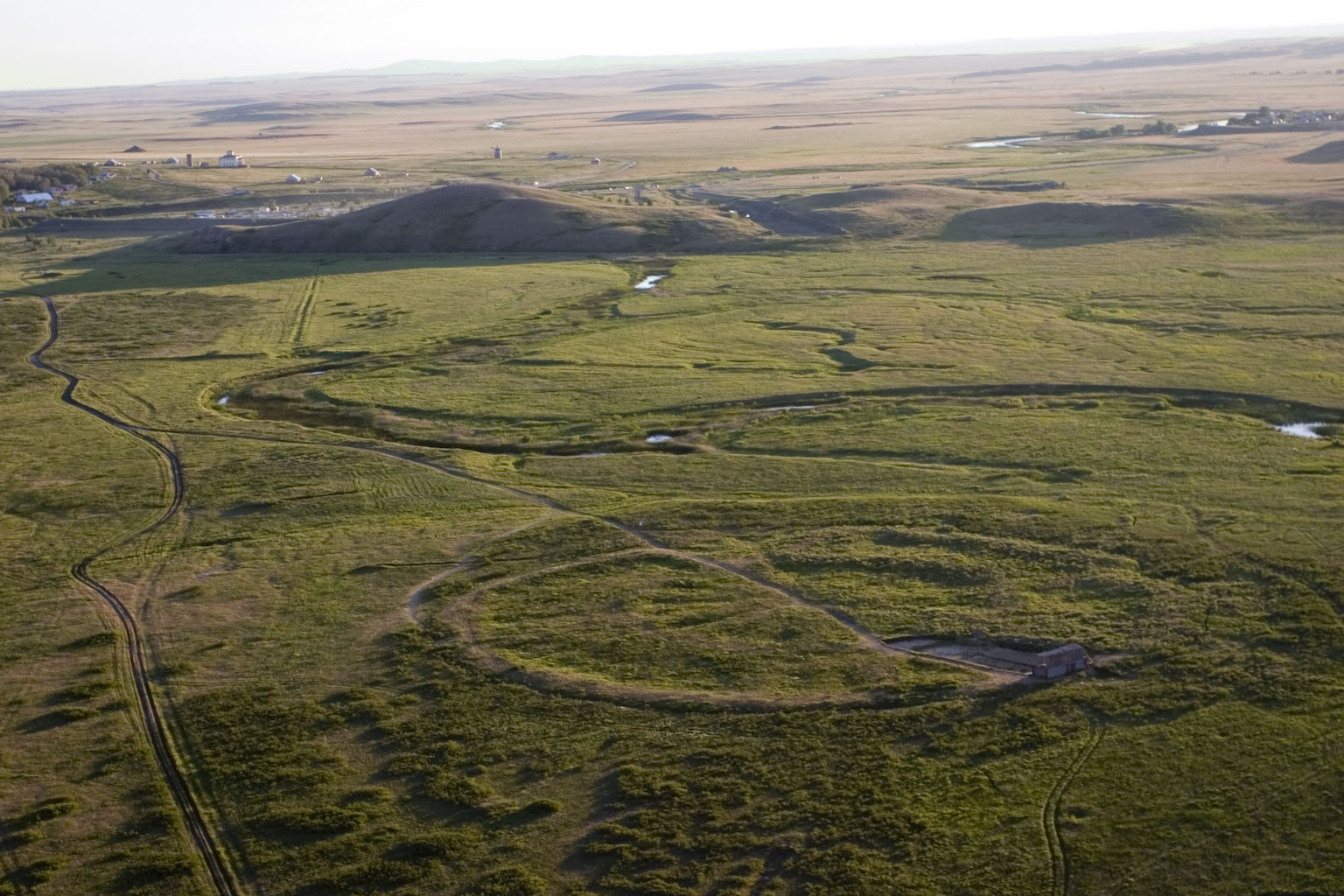
Arkaim and the surroundings

In the archaeology of Russia, the Country of Towns (Russian: Страна городов, strana gorodov) is a tentative term for a territory in the southern Trans-Urals where a number of middle Bronze Age (~2,000 BC) fortified settlements of the Sintashta culture were found in the 1970s and 1980s. The best known site of the territory is Arkaim.

Since the discovery of the Sintashta culture, aerial photography has revealed that there is a compactly grouped number of town-type settlements (over 20) in the northern steppe of the southern Trans-Urals, within an area bounded roughly 350~400 km north–south and 120~150 km east–west between Magnitorgorsk and Chelyabinsk in Orenburg Oblast, Chelyabinsk Oblast, Northern Kazakhstan and Bashkortostan. Therefore, in the 2000s, the principal investigator of this area, Gennady Zdanovich, grouped them under the tentative term "Country of Towns". Since then, while some archaeologists recognize this term as a metaphor, others insist on the literal understanding.

A colleague of Zdanovich, Fyodor Petrov, criticizes Zdanovish's views on the described territory as a unique compact object and considers the apparent compactness as an artifact of the incomplete and uncritical archaeological research. He mentions that earlier Zdanovich himself reported even more compact archaeological groupings of this type. He also writes that there are more Sintashta-type settlements discovered in Orenburg Oblast, so that when taken into an account, they would significantly blur the "clearly defined" boundaries of the "Country of Towns".
