= Gennady Zdanovich =

Russian archaeologist (1938–2020)

Gennadii Borisovich Zdanovich (Russian: Геннадий Борисович Зданович; 4 October 1938 – 19 November 2020) was a Russian archaeologist based at the historical site of Arkaim, Chelyabinsk, Russia.

Zdanovich led the excavation campaign at Arkaim in the Southern Urals.

In the archaeology of the Sintashta culture, he introduced the term "the Country of Towns". He was a proponent of an approach which seeks to unify archaeological and ecological approaches to the environment.

Zdanovich died on 19 November 2020.
