= Arkaim =

Ancient settlement of the Sintashta culture

- Аркаим (Russian)
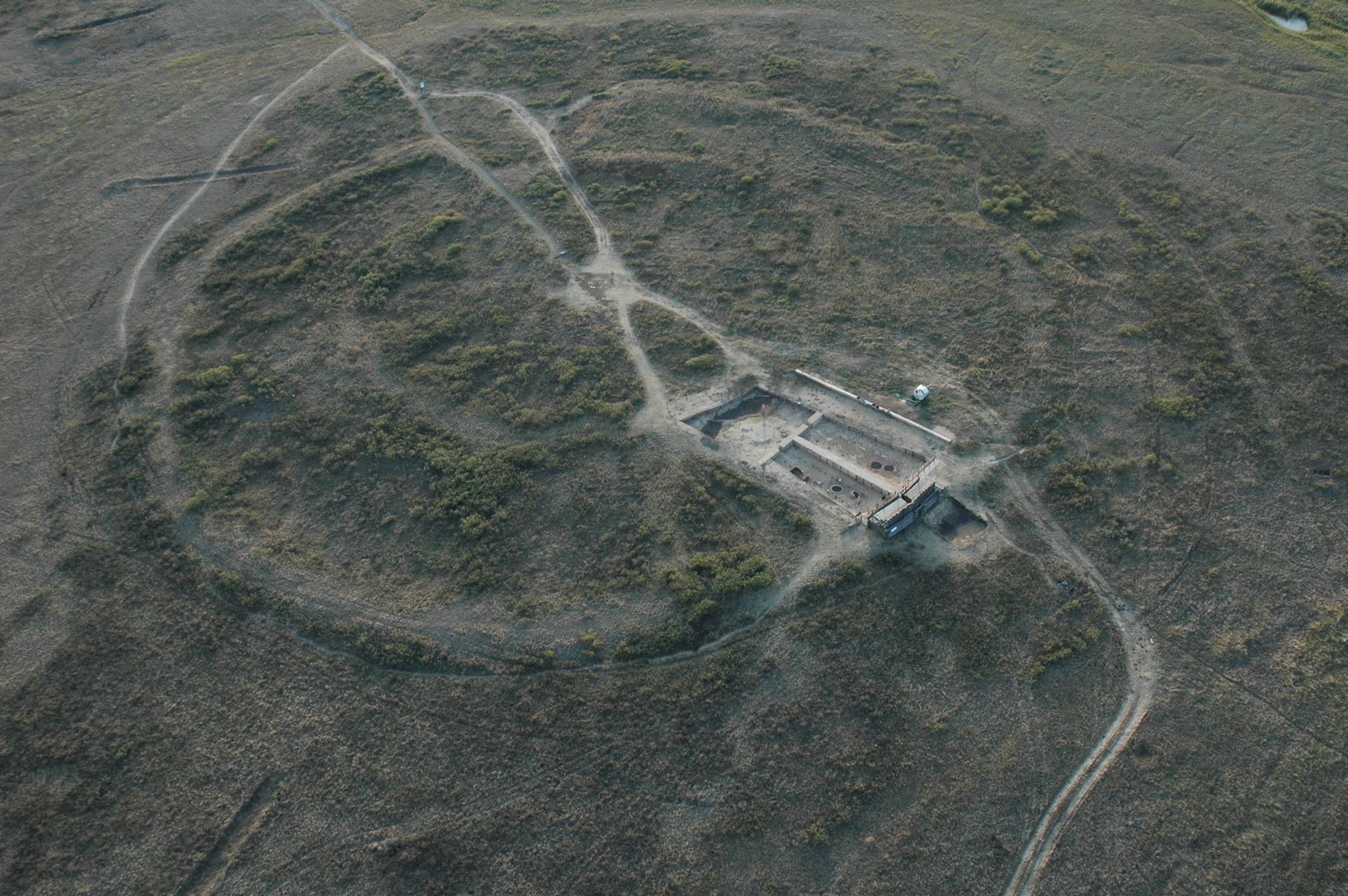
- Aerial view of the main citadel

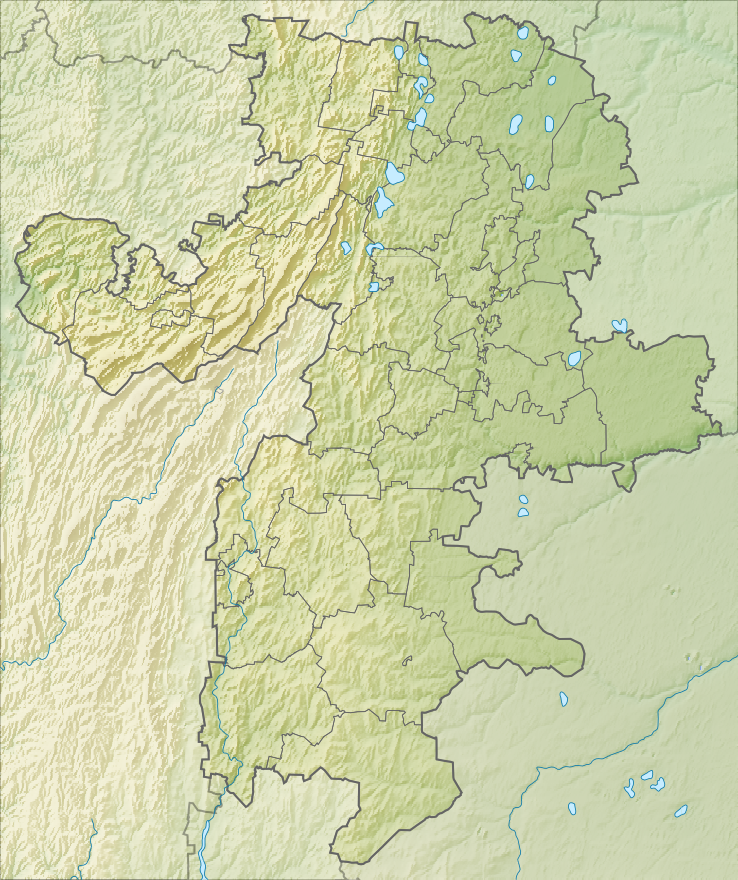
- Location in Chelyabinsk, Russia
- 52°38′57.34″N 59°34′17.194″E
- Type: Settlement
- Cultures: Sintashta culture
- Location: Chelyabinsk, Russia

History
- Built: c. 2150 BC
- Abandoned: c. 1650 BC

Site notes
- Area: 2 ha (4.9 acres)
- Archaeologists: Gennady Zdanovich
- Discovered: 20 June 1987
- Owner: Public
- Public access: Yes

Arkaim (Russian: Аркаим) is a fortified archaeological site, dated to c. 2150–1650 BC, belonging to the Sintashta culture, situated in the steppe of the Southern Urals, 8.2 km (5.10 mi) north-northwest of the village of Amursky and 2.3 km (1.43 mi) east-southeast of the village of Alexandrovsky in the Chelyabinsk Oblast of Russia, just north of the border with Kazakhstan. It was discovered in 1987 by a team of archaeologists which later came under the leadership of Gennady Zdanovich. The realization of its importance unprecedentedly forestalled the planned flooding of the area for a reservoir. The construction of Arkaim is attributed to the early Proto-Indo-Iranian-speakers of the Sintashta culture, which some scholars believe represents the proto-Indo-Iranians before their split into different groups and migration to Central Asia and from there to the Iranian plateau, Indian subcontinent and other parts of Eurasia.

== Location ==
Arkaim is located along the Bolshaya Karaganka River, which is a tributary of Ural River. Sintashta, which is the type site of the Sintashta culture, is located about 30 kilometers from Arkaim. From the source of Bolshaya Karaganka River to the source of the Sintashta River it's a straight line of 6 kilometers across the watershed. The Sintashta site was discovered in 1968 by an expedition from the Ural State University, and studied since that time; this whole nearby area was being explored until 1986.

There are several other ancient settlements in this same area, including the Bolshekaraganskiy kurgan. The Alakul settlement, which is the type site of the related Alakul culture is located to the northeast along the Miass (river), a tributary of the Tobol river.

== Discovery and salvage of the site ==
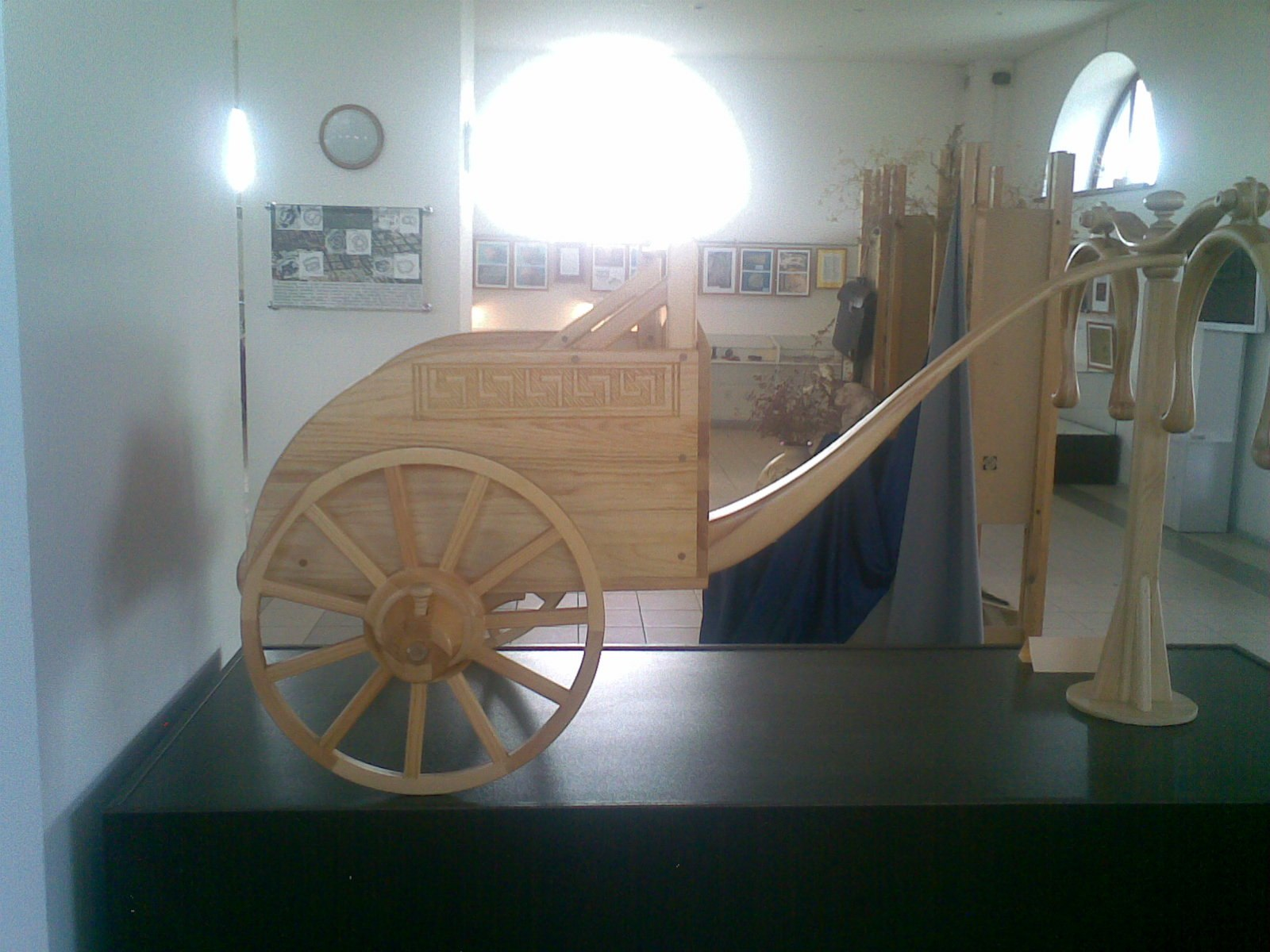
Chariot model, Arkaim museum

In the summer of 1987, a team of archaeologists headed by Gennady Zdanovich was sent to examine the archaeological value of the valley at the confluence of the Bolshaya Karaganka and Utyaganka Rivers, in the south of Chelyabinsk or the Southern Ural region, where the construction of a reservoir had begun the previous autumn. Other archaeological sites in the area were already known in the context of the study of Sintashta culture. Nevertheless, the immediate area of Arkaim across the watershed from Sintashta was not considered worthy of preservation. The site would have been flooded by the spring of 1988.

On 20 June, two local high school students who assisted in the expedition, Aleksandr Voronkov and Aleksandr Ezril, informed the archaeologists about unusual embankments they had found in the steppe. The same evening Zdanovich announced the discovery. The latter would have proven a turning point in the debates about the original homeland of the Indo-Europeans and their migrations, which Soviet specialists had been bitterly disputing about since the 1970s. The Sintashta culture, discovered and explored starting from 1968, was already attracting interest. The Sintashta exploration yielded the remains of an early chariot with horses, making apparent that the southern Urals had been a key location in the development of technology and complex civilisation. The discovery and exploration of Arkaim, with its very good preservation status, allowed to confirm that assumption.

The struggle to rescue the site was difficult since the reservoir project was overseen by the then all-powerful Ministry of Water Resources of the Soviet Union. The project was scheduled for completion in 1989, but the builders intended to hasten the construction to have it built within the spring of 1988. The archaeologists did their best to mobilise public opinion for the rescue of Arkaim, initially requesting a halt of the project until 1990; academicians and public figures spoke out in their defense. In March 1989, the Praesidium of the Urals Branch of the Academy of Sciences of the Soviet Union formally established a scientific laboratory for the study of the ancient civilisation of Chelyabinsk Oblast. A request was made to the Council of Ministers of the Russian Federation to declare the site as a protected area of historical value.

In the following months, the USSR Ministry of Water Resources was rapidly losing power as the Soviet Union moved towards collapse. In April 1991 the Council of Ministers officially cancelled the construction of the reservoir and declared Arkaim a "historical and geographical museum".

== Structure of Arkaim ==
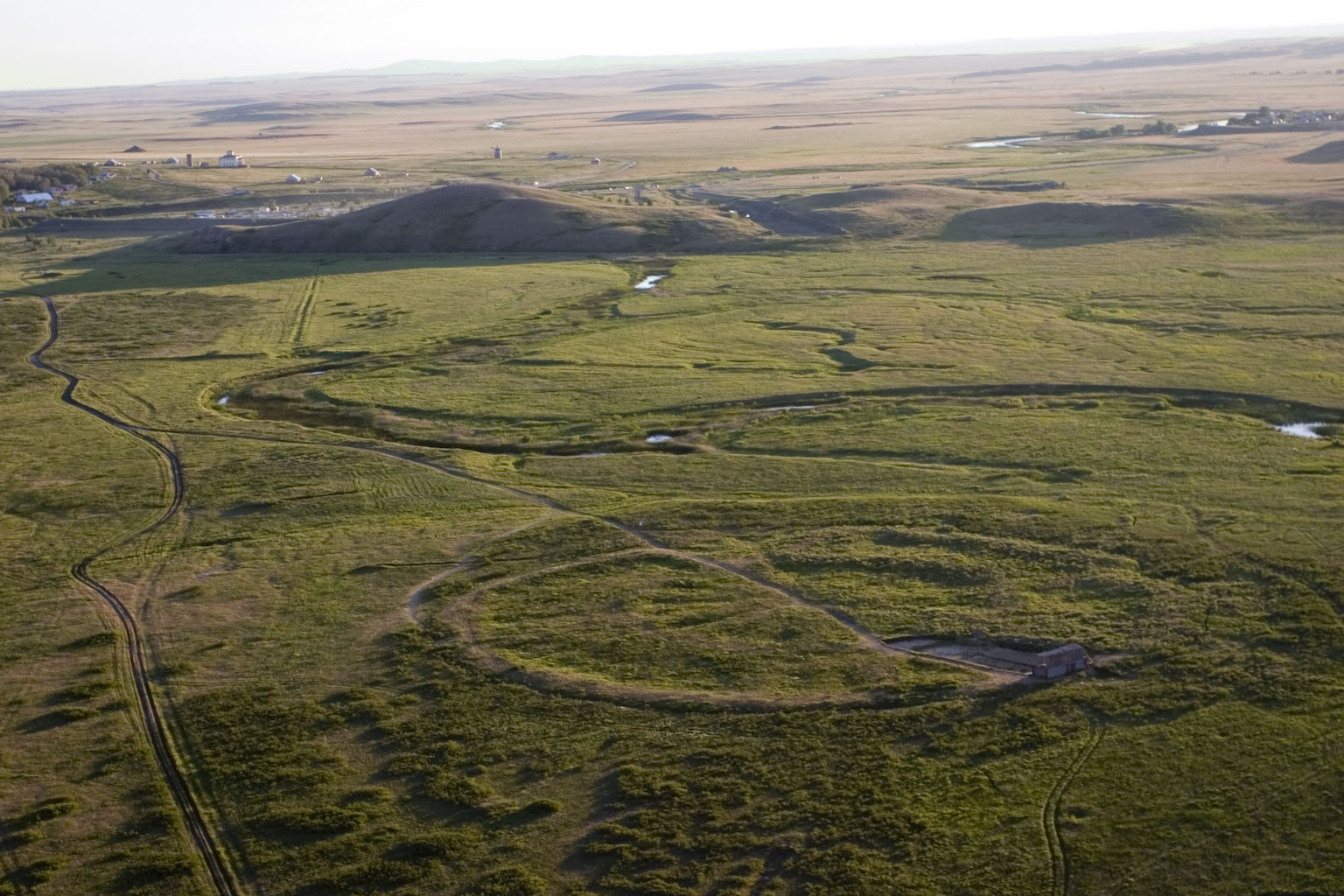
View of the Arkaim site and the surrounding landscape

Arkaim was a circular stronghold consisting of two concentric bastions made of adobe with timber frames, and covered with unfired clay bricks. Within the circles, close to the bastions, sixty dwellings stood. The dwellings had hearths, cellars, wells and metallurgical furnaces. They opened towards an inner circular street paved with wood. The street was lined by a covered drainage gutter with pits for water collection. At the centre of the complex was a rectangular open space. The complex had four entrances, consisting of intricately constructed passages and oriented towards the cardinal points. According to historian Viktor Shnirelman, "All the evidence suggests that the settlement had been built to a common plan, which is indicative of a society with a developed social structure and local leaders with high authority."

Scholars have identified the structure of Arkaim as the cities built "reproducing the model of the universe" described in ancient Indo-Aryan/Iranian spiritual literature, the Vedas and the Avesta. The structure consists of three concentric rings of walls and three radial streets, possibly reflecting the city of King Yama described in the Rigveda. The foundation walls and the dwellings of the second ring are built according to what some researchers have described as 'swastika-like patterns'; the same symbol is found on various artifacts from the site.

The fortified citadel of Arkaim was previously dated to the 17th and 16th century BC, but is currently considered to belong to c. 2050–1900 BC, period of Sintashta culture. More than twenty other structures built according to similar patterns have been found in a larger area spanning from the southern Urals' region to the north of Kazakhstan, forming the so-called "Land of Towns".

=== Measures ===
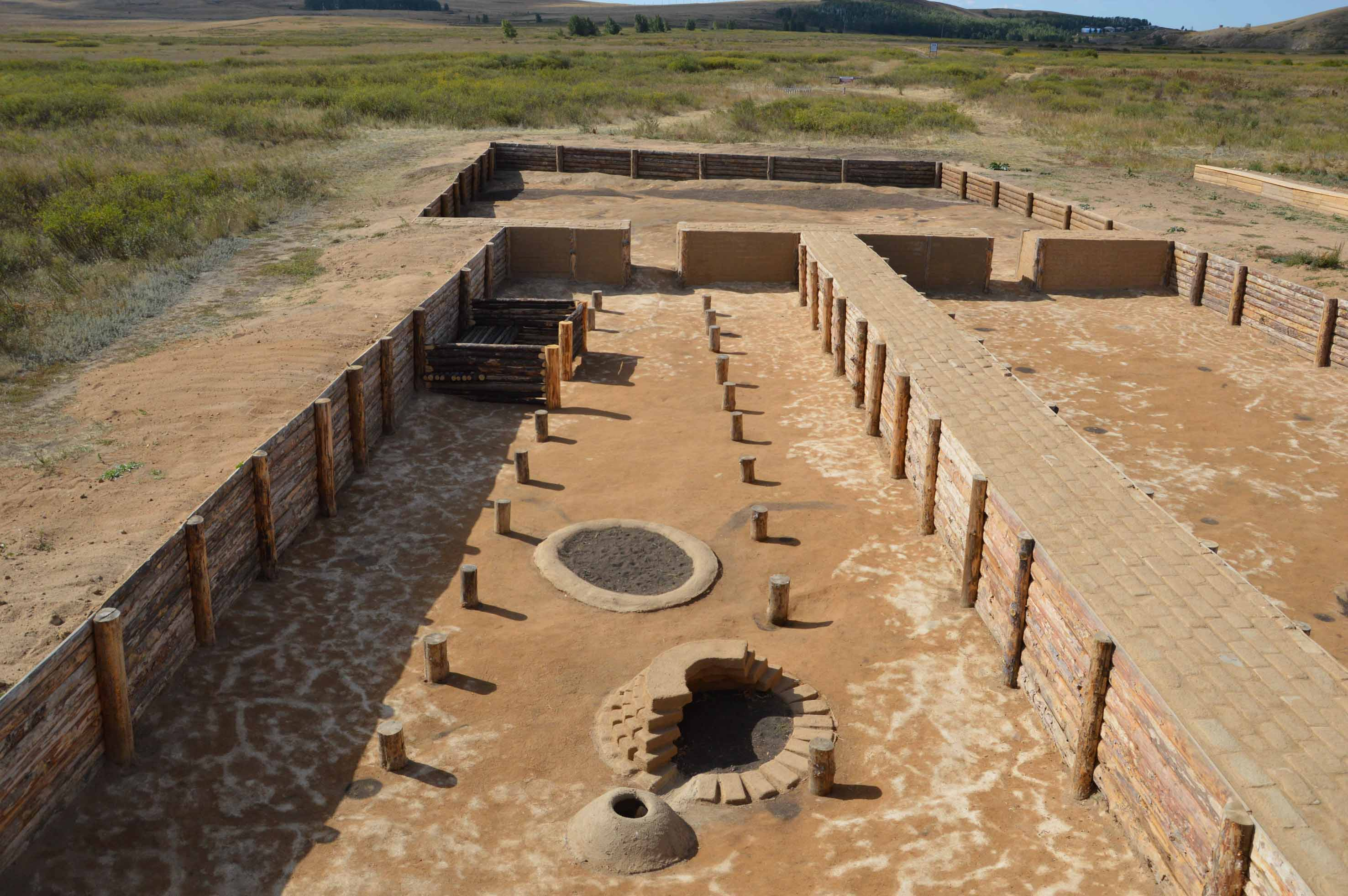
Arkaim site excavation and partial building reconstruction

The settlement covered approximately 2,000 square metres (22,000 square feet). The diameter of the enclosing wall was about 160 metres (520 feet), and its thickness was of 4 to 5 metres (13 to 16 feet). The height was 5.5 metres (18.04 feet). The settlement was surrounded with a 2-metre (6-foot-7-inch)-deep moat.

There were four gates, the main was the western one. The dwellings were between 110 and 180 square metres (1,200 and 1,900 square feet) in area. The dwellings of the outer ring were thirty-nine or forty, with doors opening towards the circular street. The dwellings of the inner ring numbered twenty-seven, arranged along the inner wall, with doors opening towards the central square, which was about 25 by 27 metres (82 by 89 feet) in area.

Zdanovich estimates that approximately 1,500 to 2,500 people could have lived in Arkaim. Surrounding Arkaim's walls, were arable fields, 130–140 metres by 45 metres (430–460 feet by 150 feet), irrigated by a system of canals and ditches.

== Religious significance ==
Many scholars suggest that the concentric design of the structure represents “the model of the universe” found in the city of King Yima (the first Indo-Iranian Priest king) as described in ancient Indo-Iranian religious literature such as the Vedas and Avesta.

== Social impact ==
=== Religious movements and mysticism ===
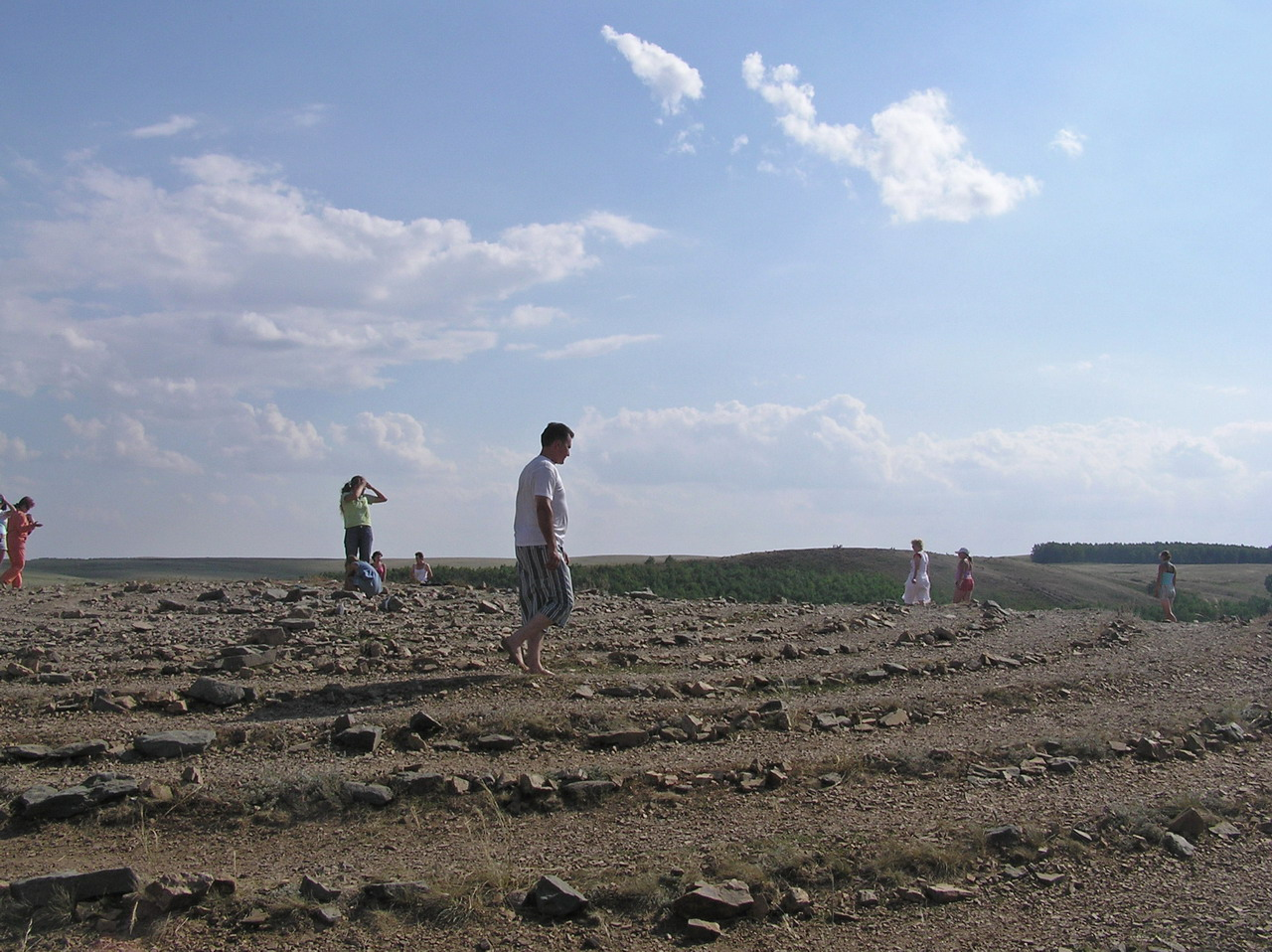
Ritual spirals of stones made by Rodnovers in the areas around Arkaim

The discovery of Arkaim reinvigorated the debate about the original homeland of the Indo-Europeans, seemingly confirming its location in Siberia. After their discovery, Arkaim and the Land of Towns have been interpreted by some as the "land of the Aryans", the centre of a statehood of a monarchical type, and ultimately the model for a new spiritual civilisation harmonised with the universe. Agencies related to the Russian Orthodox Church have been critical of such activities relating to Arkaim's archaeology.

The discovery of Arkaim and the Land of Towns has fueled the growth of schools of thought among Russian Rodnovers, Roerichians, Assianists, Zoroastrians, Hindus, and others which regard the archaeological site as the second homeland of the Indo-Europeans, who originally dwelt in Arctic regions and migrated southwards when the weather there became glacial, then spreading from Siberia to the south and the west, eventually developing into other civilisations. According to them, all Vedic knowledge originated in the southern Urals. Some of them identify Arkaim as the Asgard of Odin spoken of in Germanic mythology. The Russian Zoroastrian movement identifies Arkaim as the place where Zoroaster was born. Arkaim is designated as a "national and spiritual shrine" of Russia and has become a holy site for Rodnover, Zoroastrian and other religious movements.

== See also ==
- List of archaeoastronomical sites by country
- History of human settlement in the Ural Mountains
