= Turbasli culture =

Iron Age culture in Russia

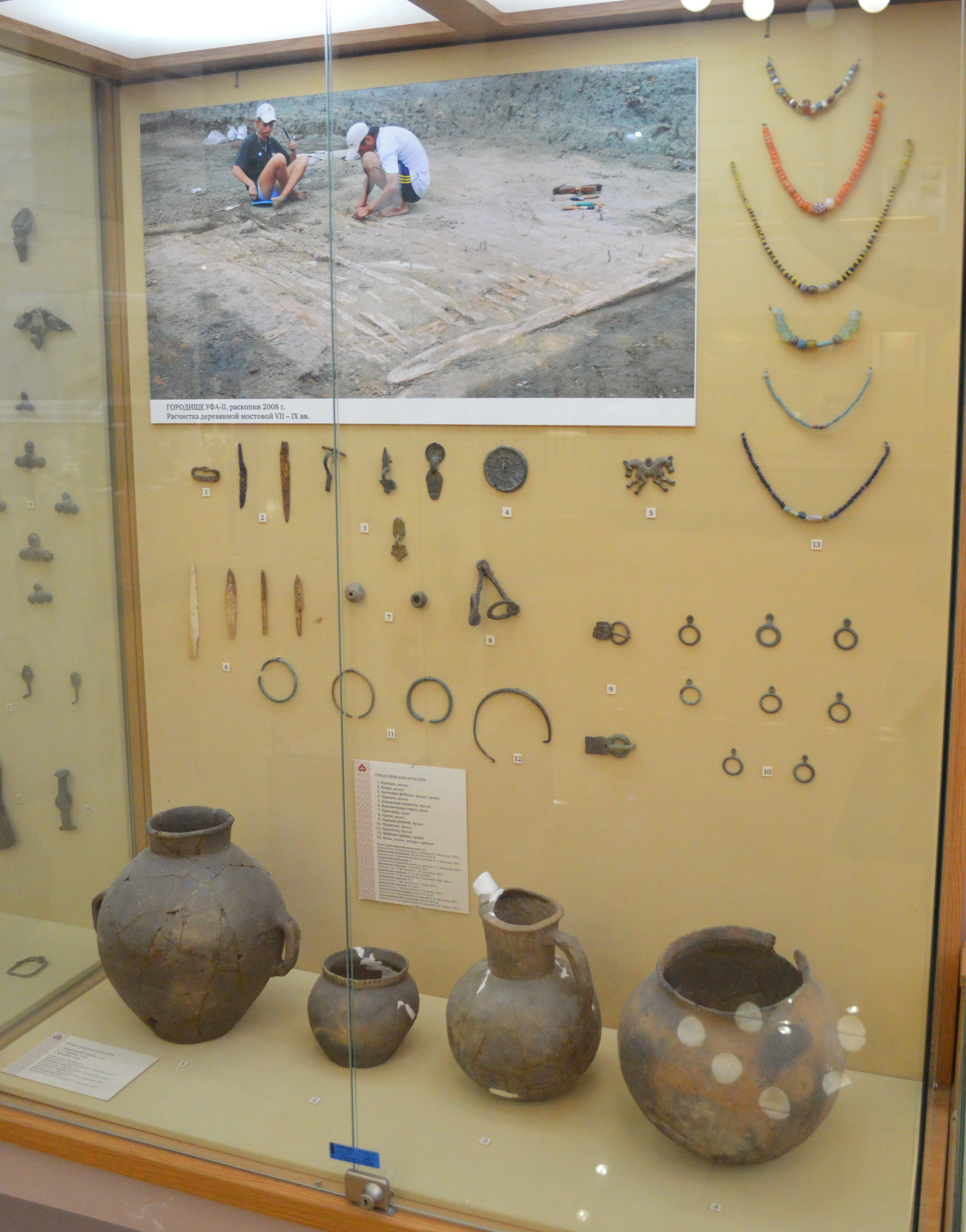
Turbasli culture artefacts

The Turbasli culture was an Iron Age culture located on the left bank of the middle reaches of the Belaya River, between the Sim River and Chermasan in Bashkortostan, Russia.

== Origin the population of Turbasli culture ==
V.F.Gening, R.D.Goldin noted Ugric population components in materials of Turbasli culture and link them to the Ural came with Ugrians from Western Siberia and South.

Other archaeologists, anthropologists, relying on established Caucasoid type of Turbasli's population and the similarity of many elements of their culture with the culture of the nomads of the steppes of Eastern European, considers that the origin of Turbasli population associated with the latest Alans (A.Kh.Pshenichnyuk, F.A.Sungatov).

E.P.Kazakov and B.A.Muratov were noted that the population of Turbasli archaeological culture by ethnic origin were Chionites.

N.A.Mazhitov considers that the population of Turbasli culture were ancestors of the ancient Bashkirs.
