= Chermasan =

Chermasan Чермасан
- Village
- Location within Bashkortostan Location within Russia
- Coordinates: 54°14′N 54°26′E
- Country: Russia
- Region: Bashkortostan
- District: Belebeyevsky District
- Time zone: UTC+5:00

Chermasan (Russian: Чермасан; Bashkir: Сәрмәсән, Särmäsän) is a rural locality (a village) in Usen-Ivanovsky Selsoviet, Belebeyevsky District, Bashkortostan, Russia. The population was 19 as of 2010. There are 2 streets.

== Geography ==
Chermasan is located 38 km northeast of Belebey (the district's administrative centre) by road. Kuryatmasovo is the nearest rural locality.
