= Sintashta culture =

Bronze Age archaeological culture of the Southern Urals

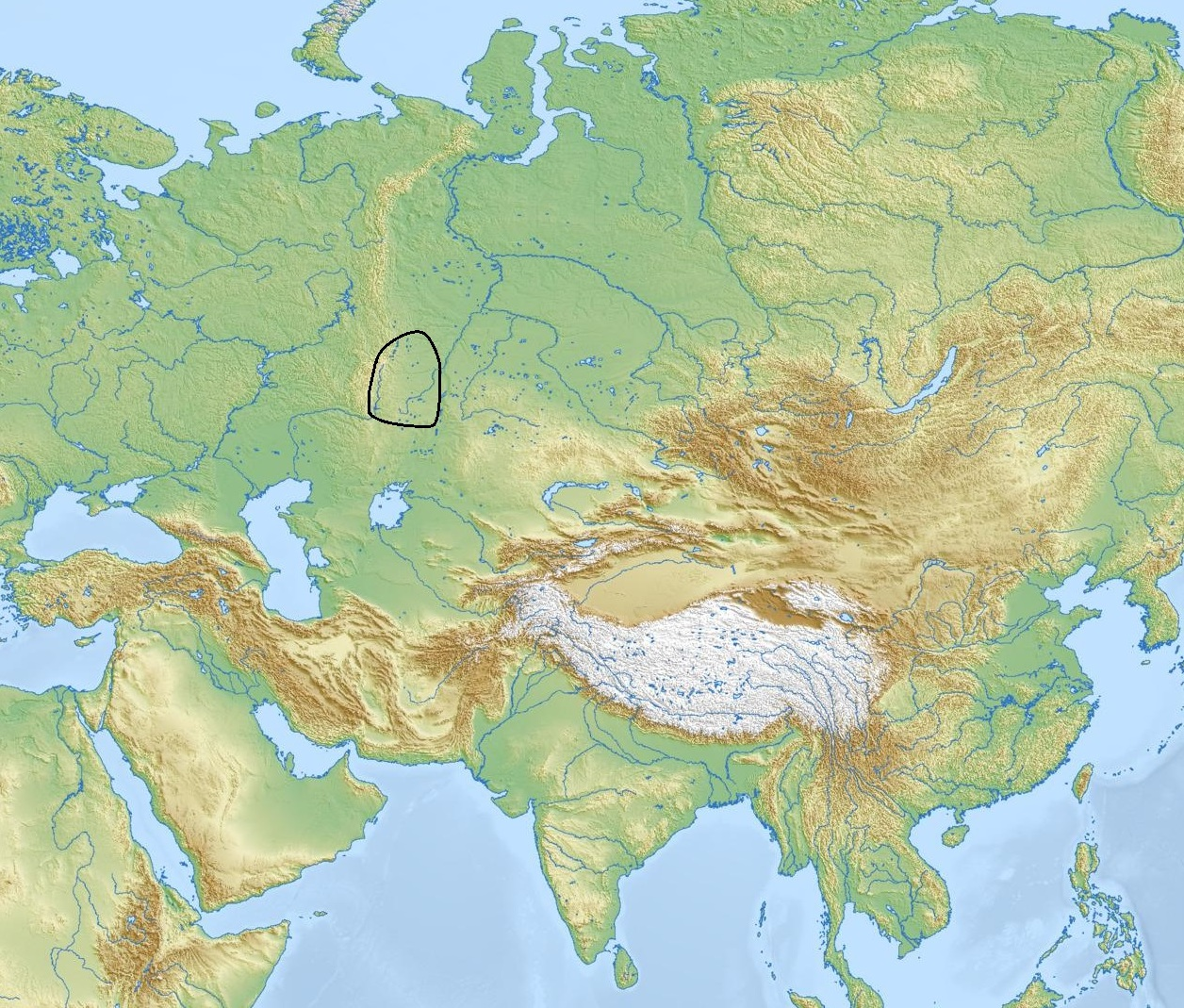
- Period: Late Middle Bronze Age
- Dates: 2200–1900 BCE
- Type site: Sintashta
- Major sites: Sintashta; Arkaim; Petrovka
- Characteristics: Extensive copper and bronze metallurgy Fortified settlements Elaborate weapon burials Earliest known chariots
- Preceded by: Corded Ware culture Poltavka culture Abashevo culture Fatyanovo–Balanovo culture
- Followed by: Andronovo culture, Srubnaya culture

The Sintashta culture (Note: /sɪnˈtɑːʃtə/; Russian: Синташтинская культура, romanised: Sintashtínskaya kultúra, pronounced [sʲɪntɐʂˈtʲinskəjə kʊlʲˈturə]) is a Middle Bronze Age archaeological culture of the Southern Urals, dated to the period c. 2200–1900 BCE. It is the first phase of the Sintashta–Petrovka complex, c. 2200–1750 BCE. The culture is named after the Sintashta archaeological site, in Chelyabinsk Oblast, Russia, and spreads through Orenburg Oblast, Bashkortostan, and Northern Kazakhstan. Widely regarded as the origin of the Indo-Iranian languages, Sintashta culture is thought to represent an eastward migration of peoples from the Corded Ware culture.

The earliest known chariots have been found in Sintashta burials, and the culture is considered a strong candidate for the origin of the technology, which spread throughout the Old World and played an important role in ancient warfare. Sintashta settlements are also remarkable for the intensity of copper mining and bronze metallurgy carried out there, which is unusual for a steppe culture. Among the main features of the Sintashta culture are high levels of militarism and extensive fortified settlements, of which 23 are known.

== Origin ==
Because of the difficulty of identifying the remains of Sintashta sites beneath those of later settlements, the culture was only distinguished in the 1990s from the Andronovo culture. It was then recognised as a distinct entity, forming part of the "Andronovo horizon". Koryakova (1998) concluded from their archaeological findings that the Sintashta culture originated from the interaction of the two precursors Poltavka culture and Abashevo culture. Allentoft et al. (2015) concluded from their genetic results that the Sintashta culture should have emerged from an eastward migration of peoples from the Corded Ware culture. In addition, Narasimshan et al. (2019) cautiously cite that "morphological data has been interpreted as suggesting that both Fedorovka and Alakul' skeletons are similar to Sintashta groups, which in turn may reflect admixture of Neolithic forest hunter gatherers and steppe pastoralists, descendants of the Catacomb and Poltavka cultures".

Sintashta emerged during a period of climatic change that saw the already arid Kazakh steppe region become even colder and drier. The marshy lowlands around the Ural and upper Tobol rivers, previously favoured as winter refuges, became increasingly important for survival. Under these pressures both Poltavka and Abashevo herders settled permanently in river valley strongholds, eschewing more defensible hill-top locations.

Its immediate predecessor in the Ural-Tobol steppe was the Poltavka culture, an offshoot of the cattle-herding Yamnaya horizon that moved east into the region between 2800 and 2600 BCE. Several Sintashta towns were built over older Poltavka settlements or close to Poltavka cemeteries, and Poltavka motifs are common on Sintashta pottery.

Sintashta material culture also shows the influence of the late Abashevo culture, derived from the Fatyanovo–Balanovo culture, a collection of Corded Ware settlements in the forest steppe zone north of the Sintashta region that were also predominantly pastoralist.

== Chronology ==
Radiocarbon dating indicates that the Sintashta culture dates to between c. 2200 and 1750 BCE, roughly contemporary with the associated Abashevo and Petrovka cultures. Some authors date the Petrovka culture slightly later, from c. 1900 BCE.

In Cis-Urals, burial sites Berezovaya and Tanabergen II showed Sintashta culture established there c. 2290–1750 BCE (68.2% probability), and the earliest values of this culture, in Trans-Urals, at the burial sites Sintashta II and Kamenny Ambar-5 (Kurgan 2) are c. 2200–2000 BCE.

Chariots appear in southern Trans-Urals region in middle and late phases of the culture, c. 2050–1750 BC. According to Chechuskov & Epimakhov (2018) "chariot technology likely developed before the year 2000 BC in the Sintashta homeland, which is the Don–Volga interfluve."

Blöcher et al. (2023) consider Sintashta-Petrovka period came to an end in Trans-Urals c. 1900–1800 BCE.

== Society ==
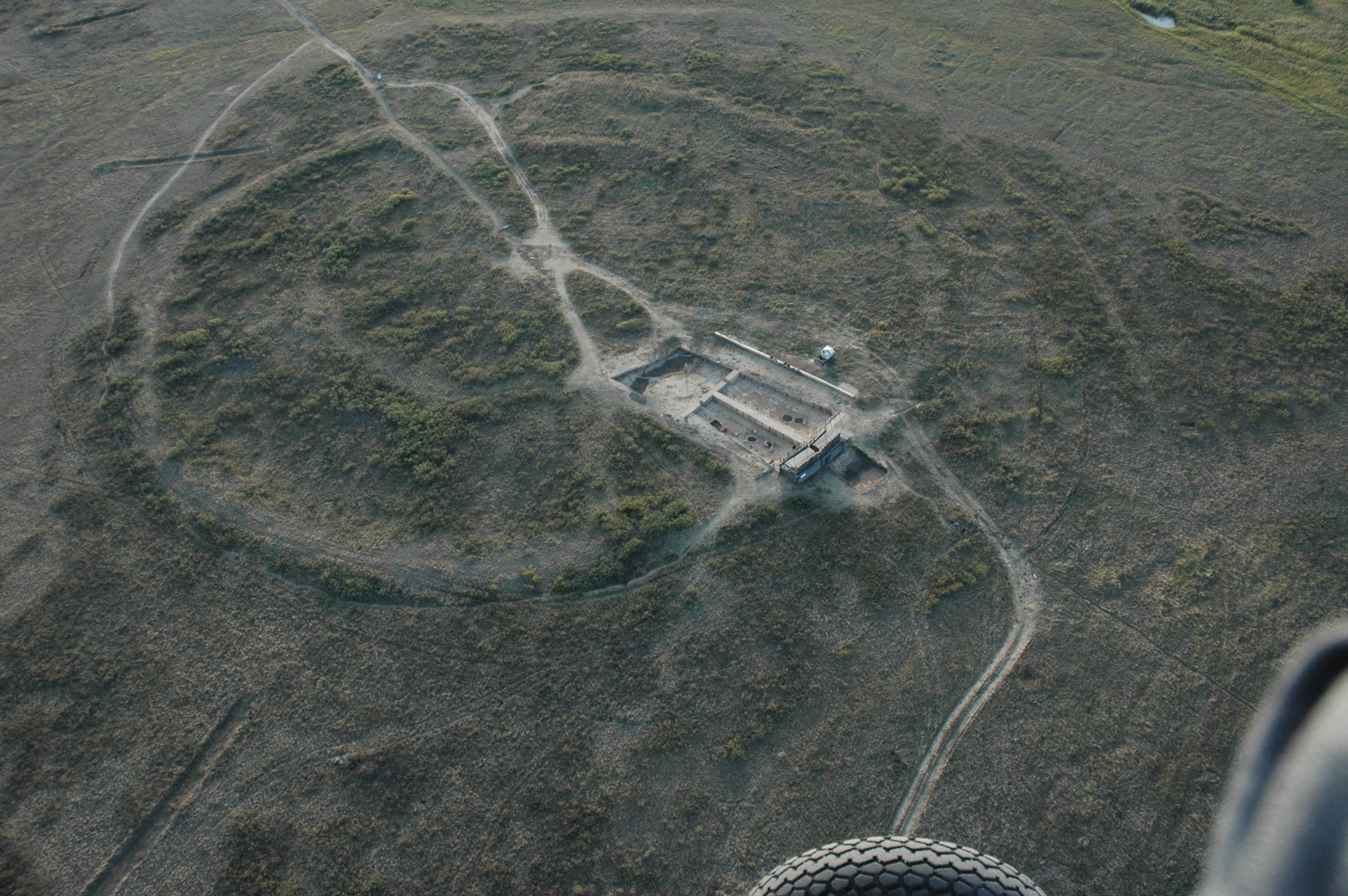
Aerial view of Arkaim

Sintashta settlements are estimated to have a population of between 200 and 700 individuals with economies that "heavily exploited domesticated cattle, sheep, and goats alongside horses with occasional hunting of wild fauna".

=== Linguistic identity ===
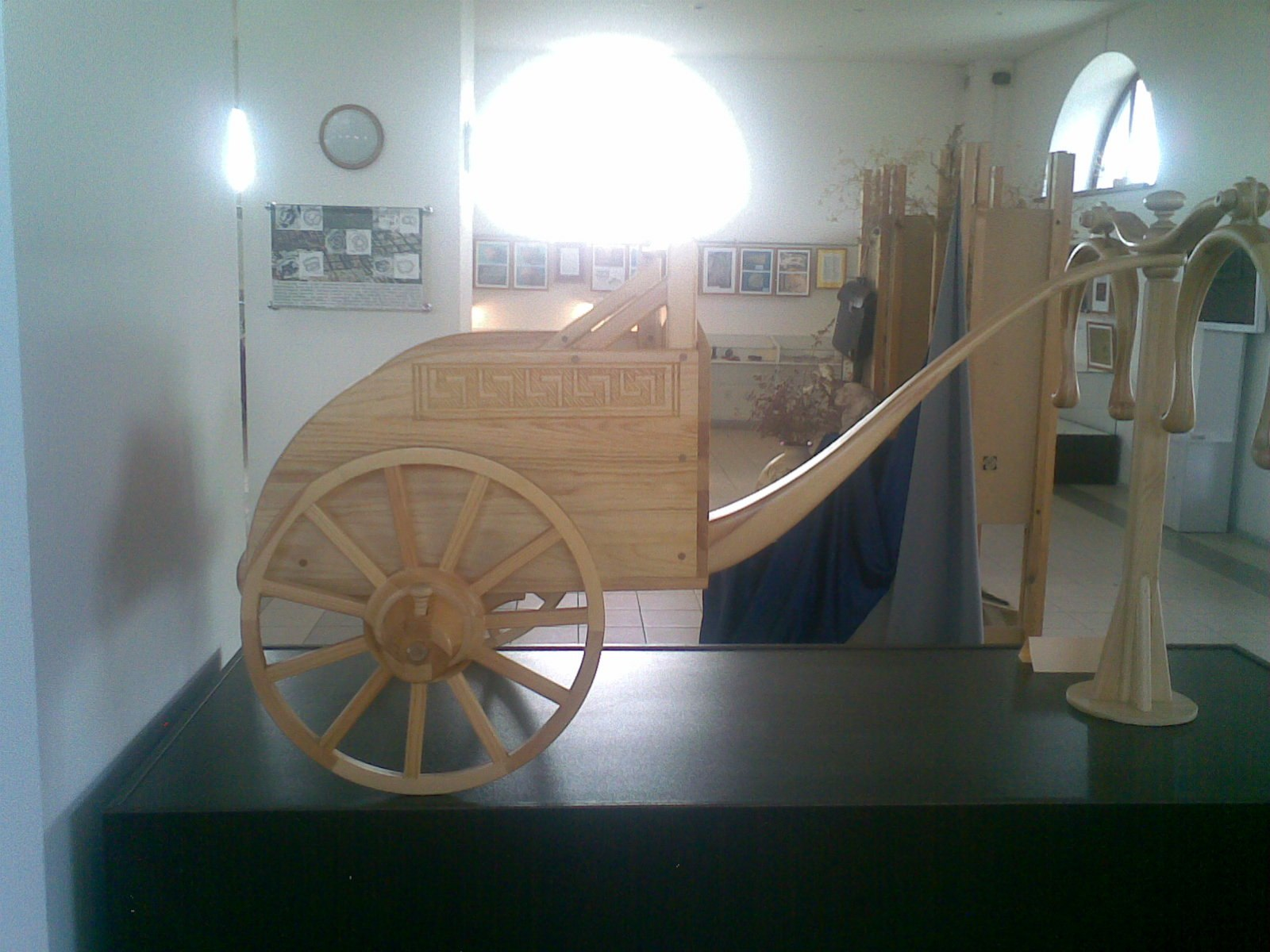
Chariot model, Arkaim museum

Anthony (2007) assumes that probably the people of the Sintashta culture spoke "Common Indo-Iranian". This identification is based primarily on similarities between sections of the Rigveda, a religious text which includes ancient Indo-Iranian hymns recorded in Vedic Sanskrit, and the funerary rituals of the Sintashta culture as revealed by archaeology. Some cultural similarities to the Sintashta culture have also been found in the Nordic Bronze Age of Scandinavia.

There is linguistic evidence of interaction between Finno-Ugric and Indo-Iranian languages, showing influences from the Indo-Iranians into the Finno-Ugric culture.

From the Sintashta culture the Indo-Iranian followed the migrations of the Indo-Iranians to Anatolia, the Iranian plateau and the Indian subcontinent. From the 9th century BCE onward, Iranian languages also migrated westward with the Scythians back to the Pontic steppe where the Proto-Indo-Europeans came from.

=== Warfare ===
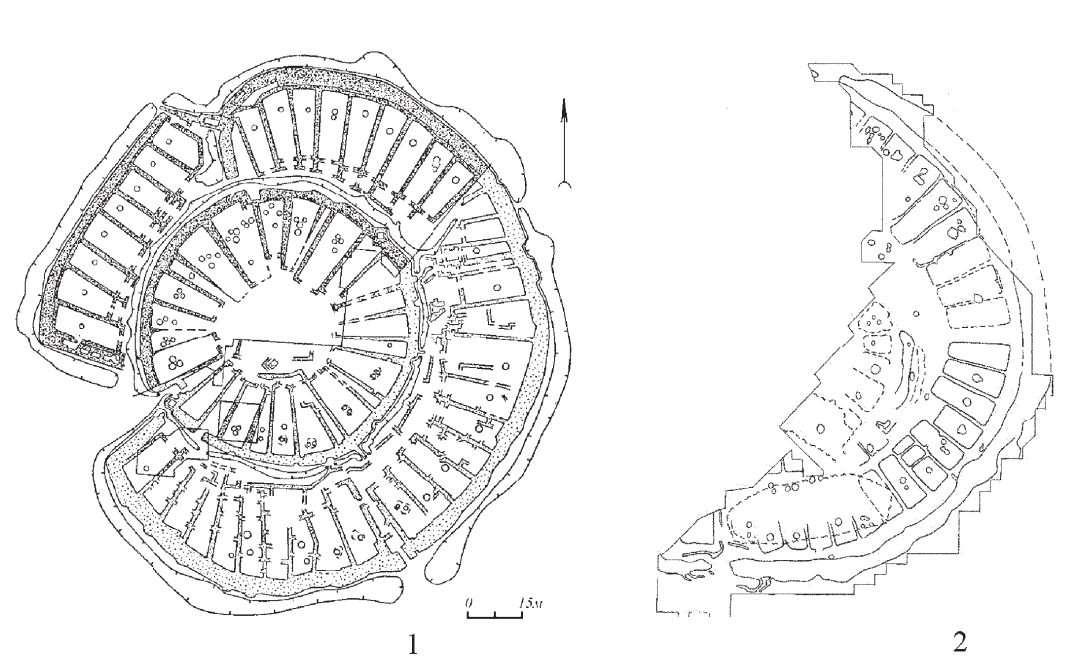
Arkaim and Sintashta settlement ground plans

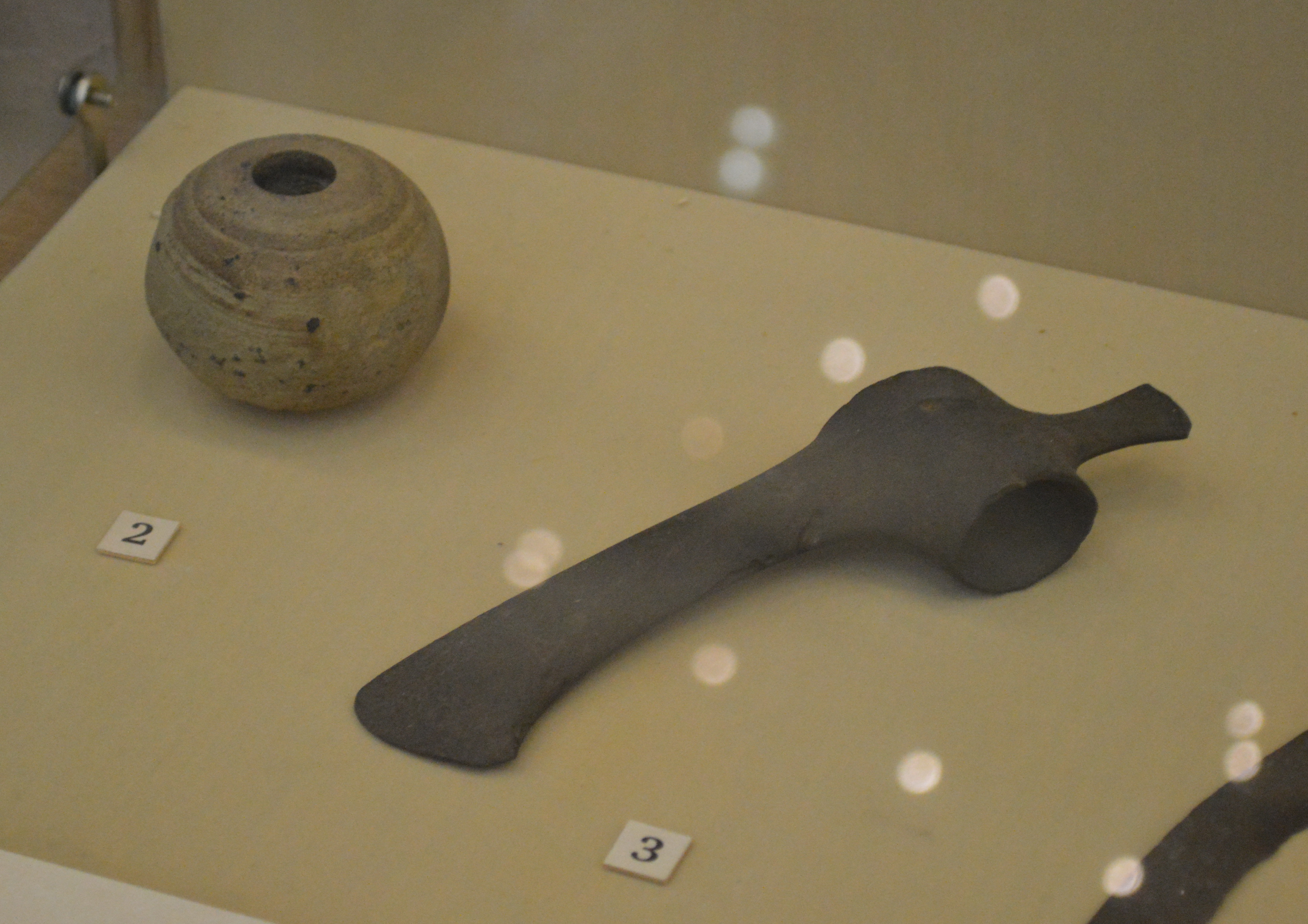
Mace and axe heads from Sintashta grave

The preceding Abashevo culture was already marked by endemic intertribal warfare; intensified by ecological stress and competition for resources in the Sintashta period. This drove the construction of fortifications on an unprecedented scale and innovations in military technique such as the invention of the war chariot. Increased competition between tribal groups may also explain the extravagant sacrifices seen in Sintashta burials, as rivals sought to outdo one another in acts of conspicuous consumption analogous to the North American potlatch tradition.

Sintashta artefact types such as spearheads, trilobed arrowheads, chisels, and large shaft-hole axes were taken east. Many Sintashta graves are furnished with weapons, although the composite bow associated later with chariotry does not appear. Higher-status grave goods include chariots, as well as axes, mace-heads, spearheads, and cheek-pieces. Sintashta sites have produced finds of horn and bone, interpreted as furniture (grips, arrow rests, bow ends, string loops) of bows; there is no indication that the bending parts of these bows included anything other than wood. Arrowheads are also found, made of stone or bone rather than metal. These arrows are short, 50–70 cm long, and the bows themselves may have been correspondingly short.

Sintashta culture, and the chariot, are also strongly associated with the ancestors of modern domestic horses, the DOM2 population. DOM2 horses originated from the Western Eurasia steppes, especially the lower Volga-Don, but not in Anatolia, during the late fourth and early third millennia BCE, after which the single horse lineage would become the ancestor of nearly all modern horses, due to genes showing selection for easier domestication and stronger backs.

=== Metal production ===
External videos
- The Sintashta culture - earliest chariots, fortified settlements and bronze metallurgy. Ivan Semyan

The Sintashta economy came to revolve around copper metallurgy. Copper ores from nearby mines (such as Vorovskaya Yama) were taken to Sintashta settlements to be processed into copper and arsenical bronze. This occurred on an industrial scale: all the excavated buildings at the Sintashta sites of Sintashta, Arkaim and Ustye contained the remains of smelting ovens and slag. Around 10% of graves, mostly adult male, contained artefacts related to bronze metallurgy (molds, ceramic nozzles, ore and slag remains, metal bars and drops). However, these metal-production related grave goods rarely co-occur with higher-status grave goods. This likely means that those who engaged in metal production were not at the top of the social-hierarchy, even though being buried at a cemetery evidences some sort of higher status.

Much of Sintashta metal was destined for export to the cities of the Bactria–Margiana Archaeological Complex (BMAC) in Central Asia. The metal trade between Sintashta and the BMAC for the first time connected the steppe region to the ancient urban civilisations of the Near East: the empires and city-states of modern Iran and Mesopotamia provided a large market for metals. These trade routes later became the vehicle through which horses, chariots and ultimately Indo-Iranian-speaking people entered the Near East from the steppe.

== Gallery ==
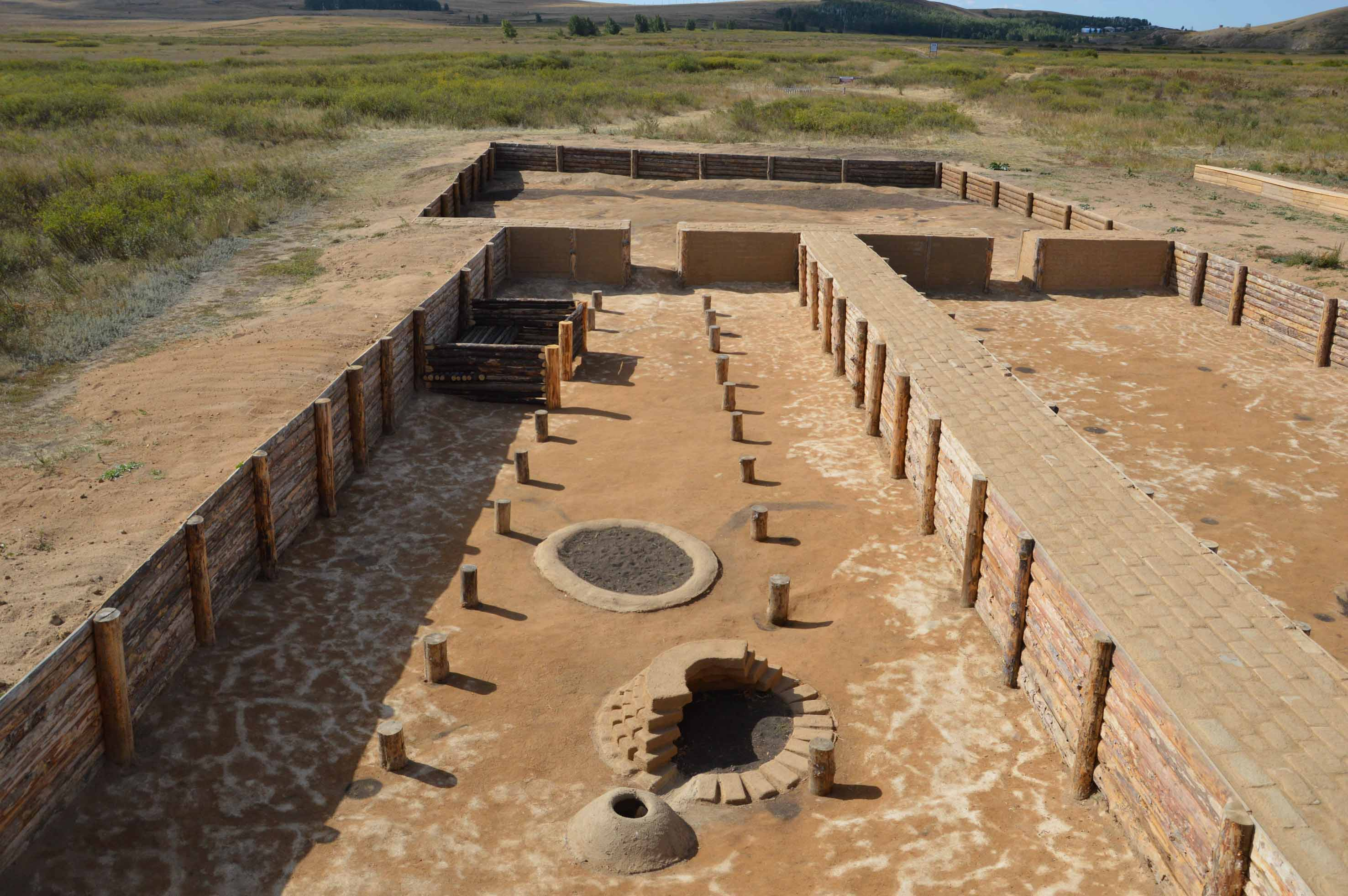
Excavation and partial building reconstruction at Arkaim

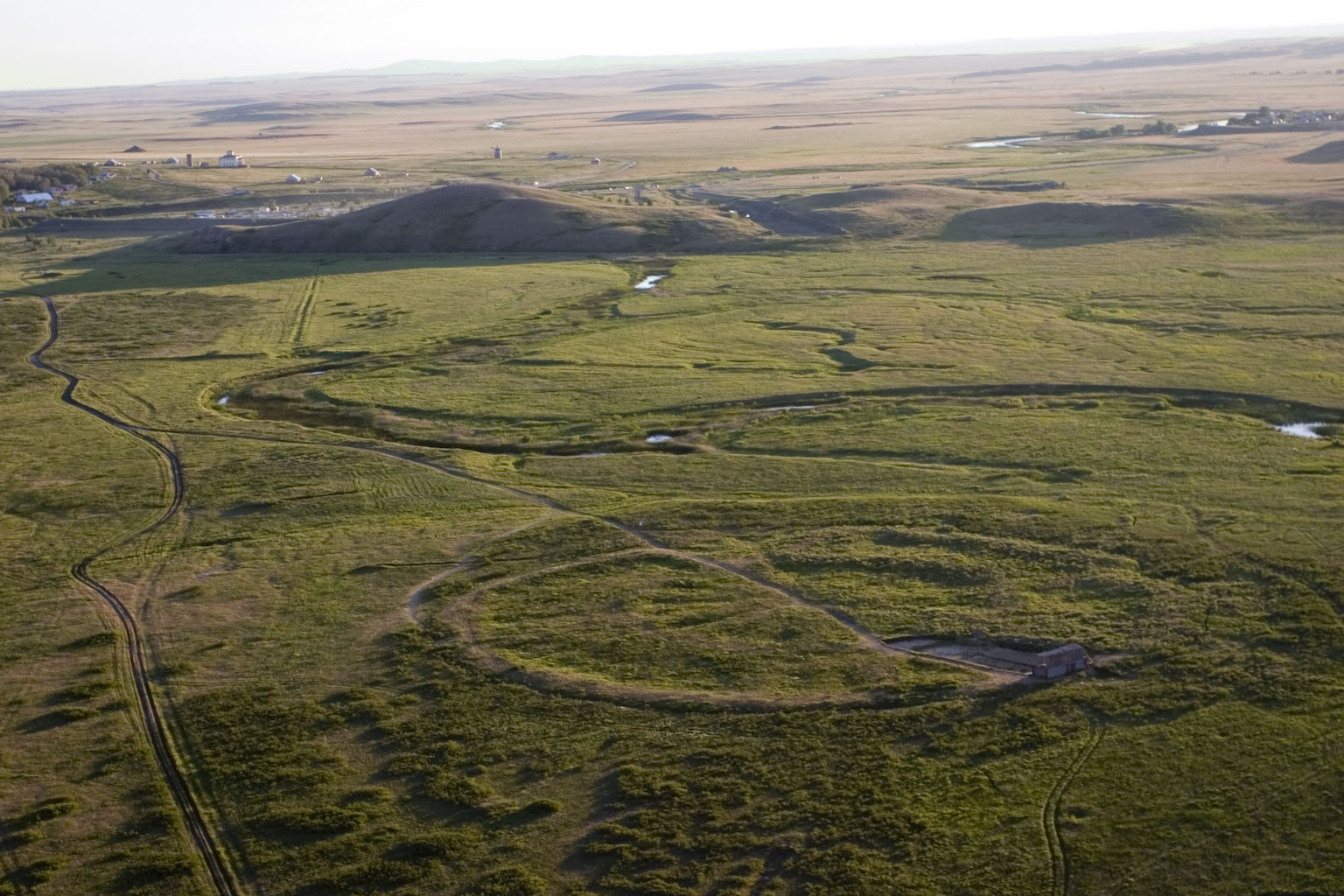
View of the Arkaim site and surrounding landscape

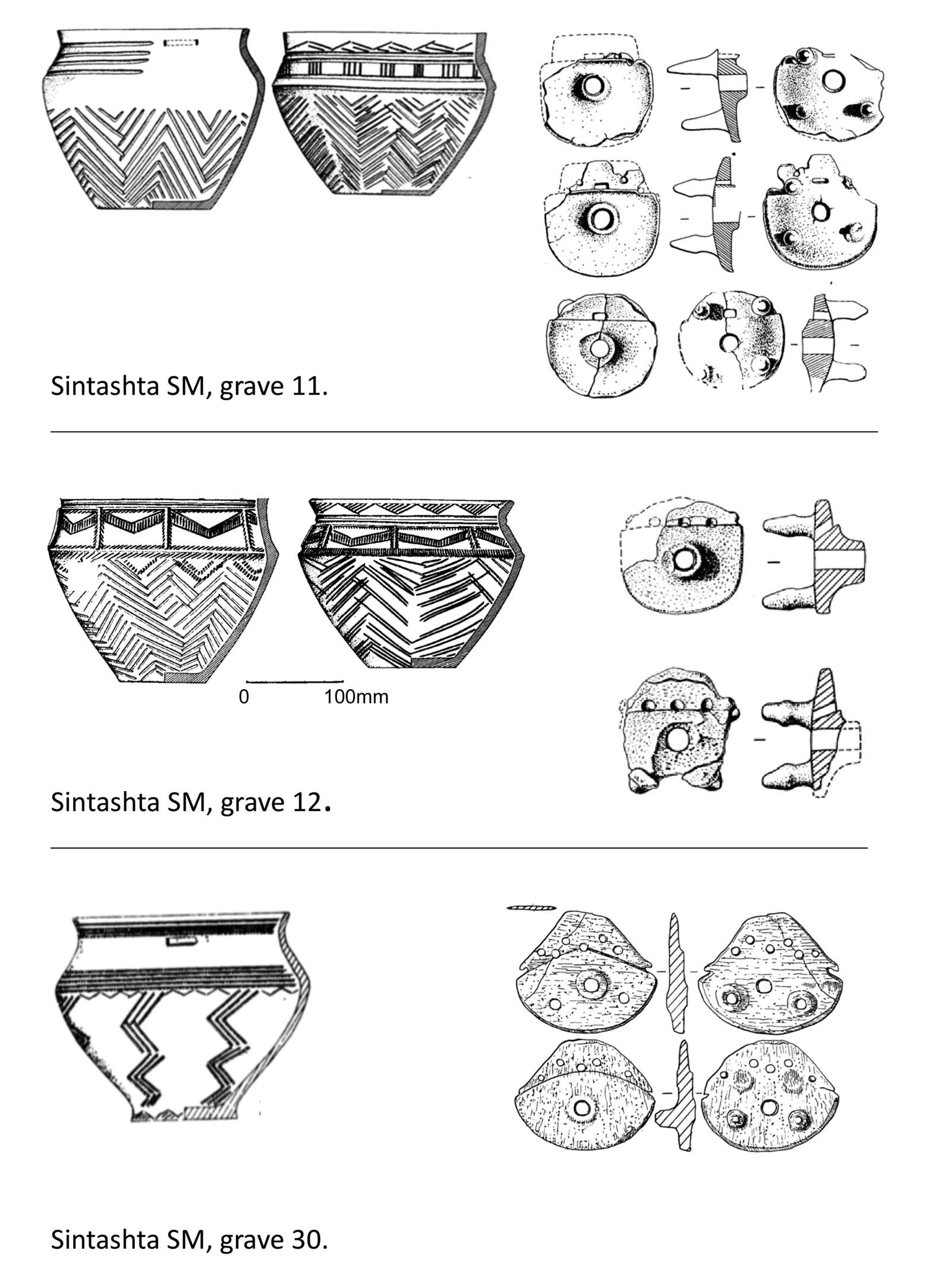
Sintashta ceramics and horse bridle cheekpieces

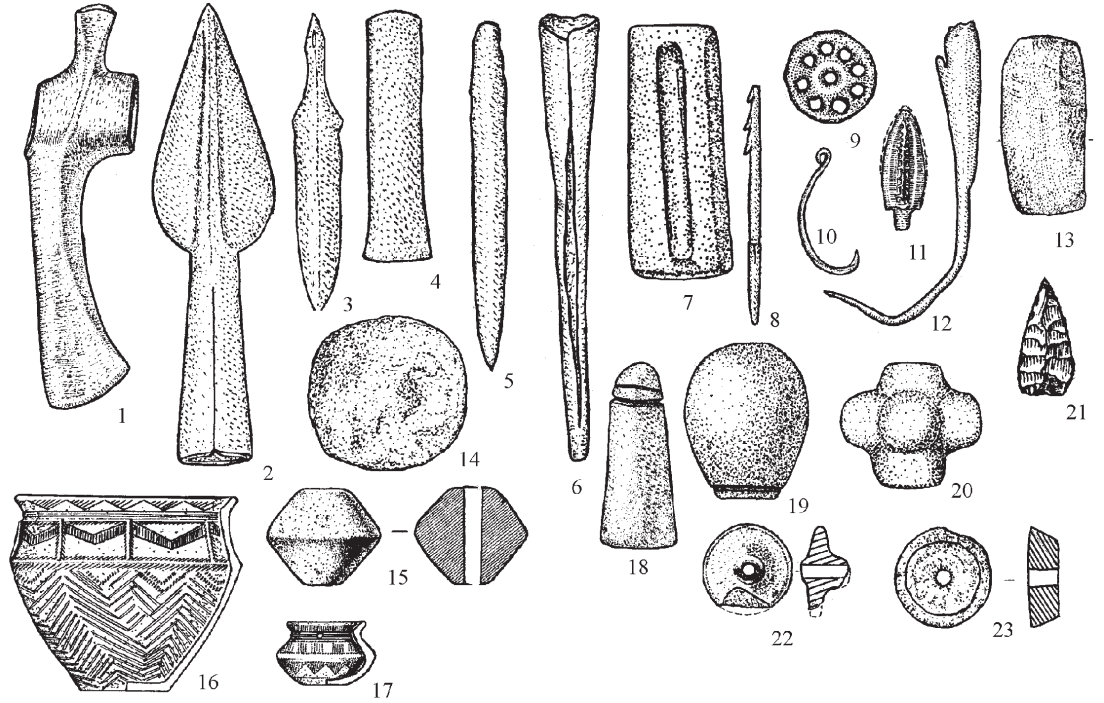
Sintashta culture artefacts

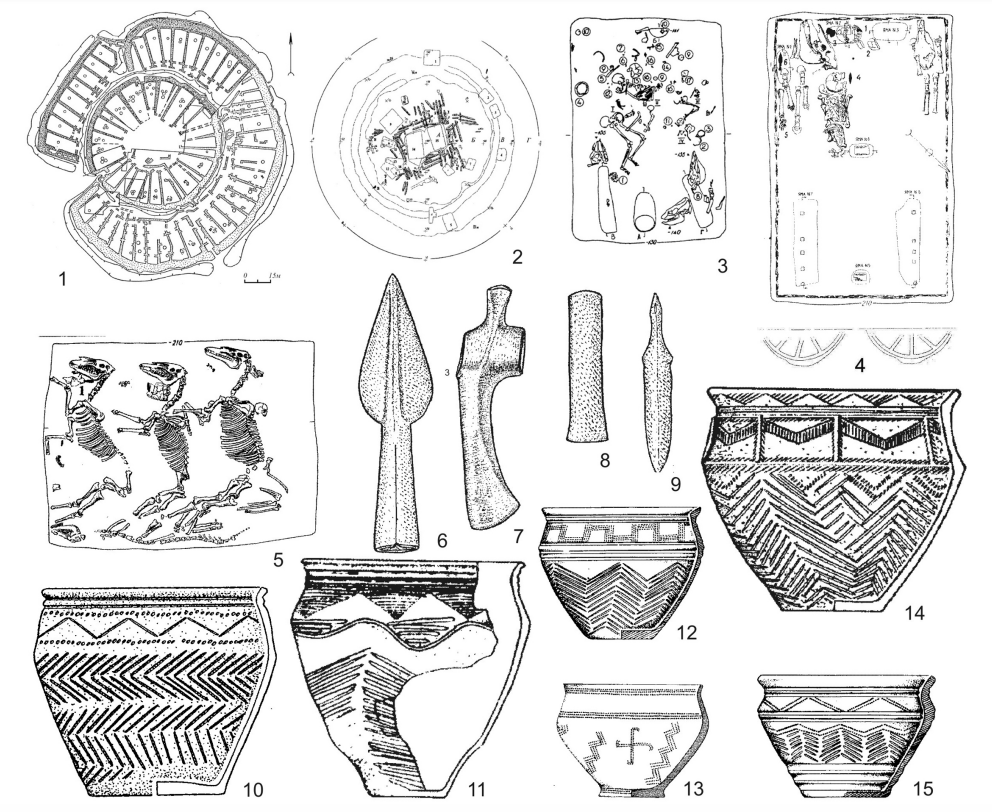
Sintashta culture artefacts

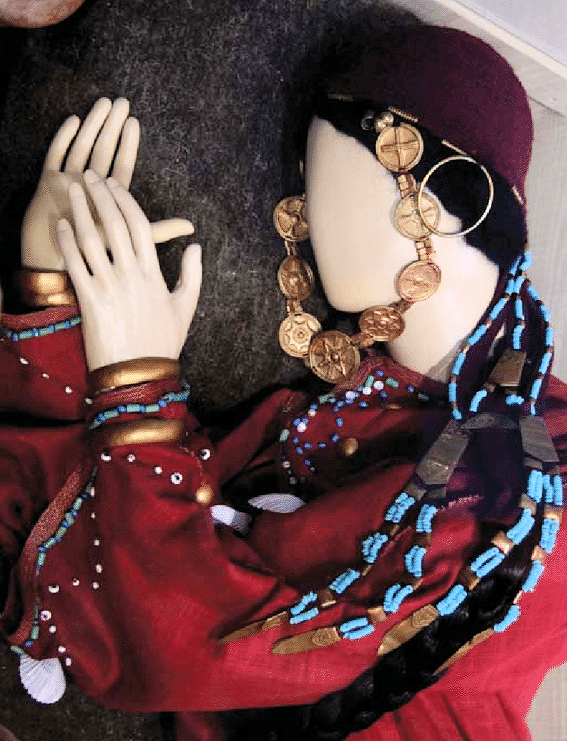
Reconstruction of jewellery from the Sintashta culture

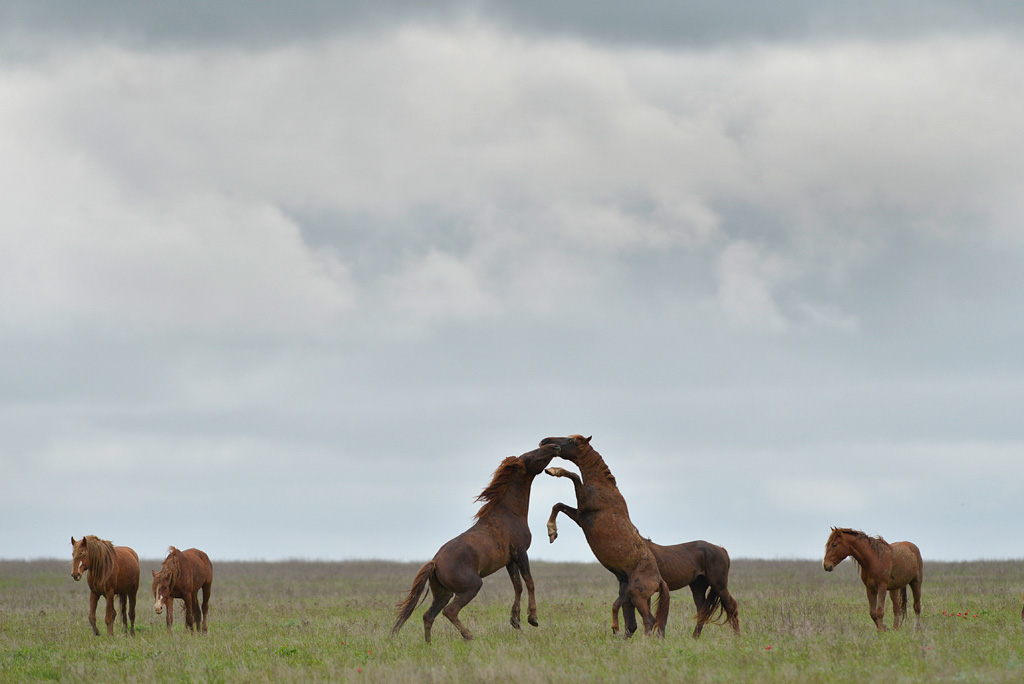
The Sintashta culture is associated with the spread of domesticated horses

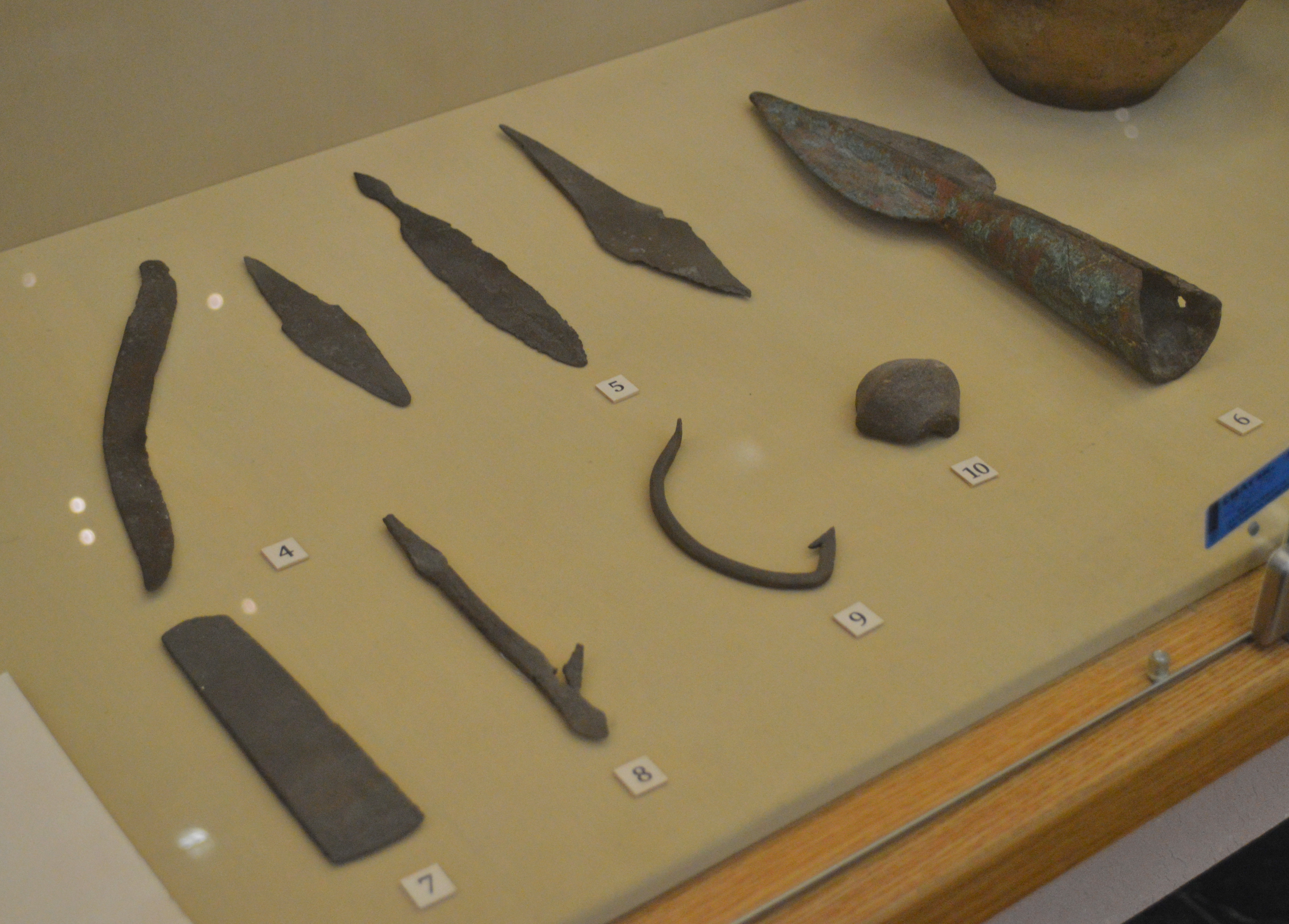
Sintashta metal artefacts

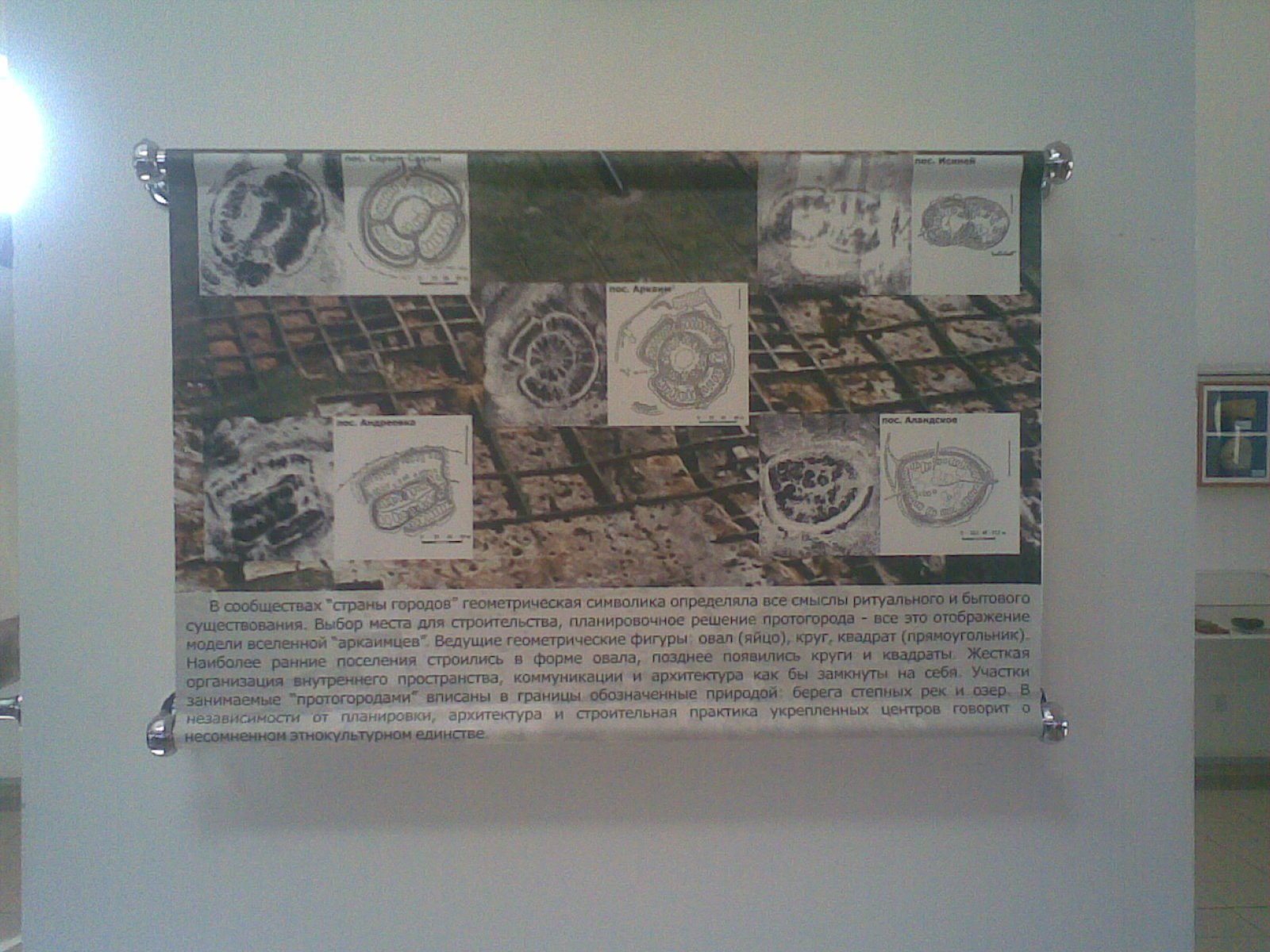
Sintashta culture settlements in the "Country of towns"

== Genetics ==
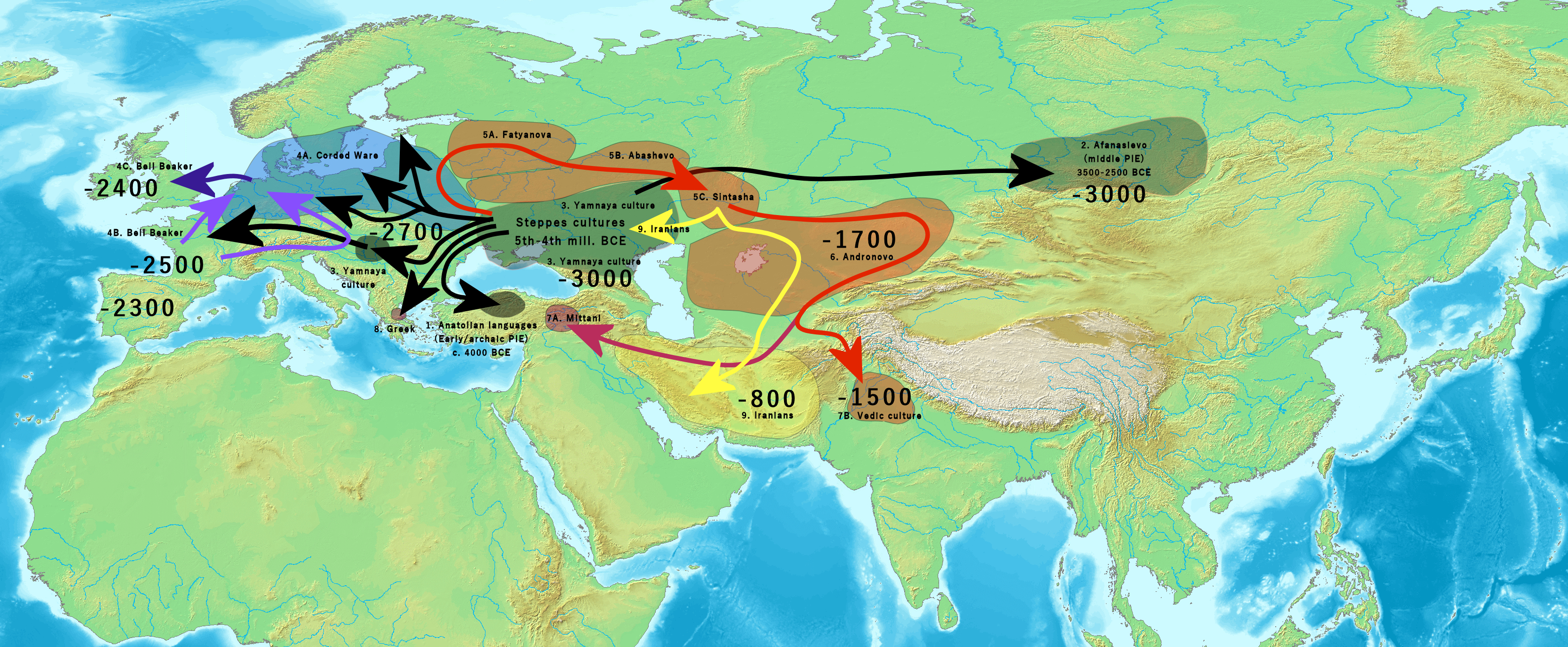
Early Indo-European migrations from the Pontic steppes spread Yamnaya Steppe pastoralist ancestry and Indo-European languages across large parts of Eurasia.

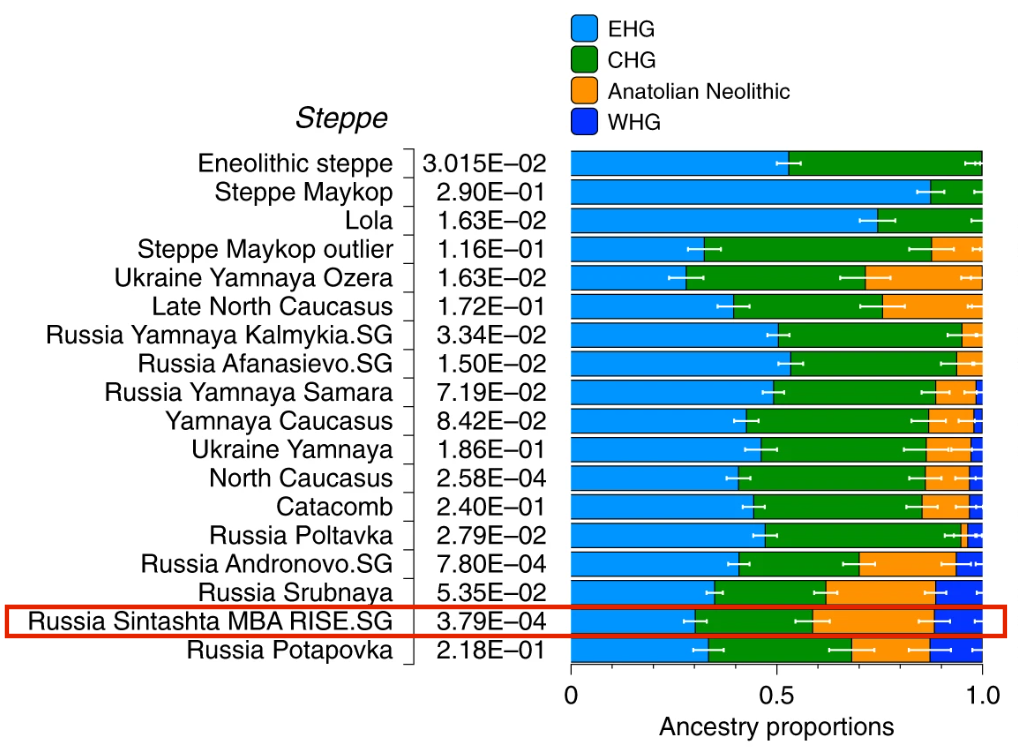
Admixture proportions of Sintashta populations modelled by Wang et al. (2019). They combined Eastern Hunter Gatherer ( EHG), Caucasian Hunter-Gatherer ( CHG), Anatolian Neolithic ( ) and Western Hunter Gatherer ( WHG) ancestry.

Allentoft et al. 2015 analysed the remains of four individuals ascribed to the Sintastha culture. One male carried Y-haplogroup R1a and mt-J1c1b1a, while the other carried Y-R1a1a1b and mt-J2b1a2a. The two females carried U2e1e and U2e1h respectively. The study found a close autosomal genetic relationship between peoples of Corded Ware culture and Sintashta culture, which "suggests similar genetic sources of the two," and may imply that "the Sintashta derives directly from an eastward migration of Corded Ware peoples." Sintashta individuals and Corded Ware individuals both had a relatively higher ancestry proportion derived from Central Europe, and both differed markedly in such ancestry from the population of the Yamnaya Culture and most individuals of the Poltavka Culture that preceded Sintashta in the same geographic region. (Note: Allentoft et al. (2015) analysed ancient DNA recovered from remains at four Sintashta sites. The five samples analysed included the mitochondrial DNA haplogroups U2e, J1, J2 and N1a. The two male individuals both belonged to Y-chromosome haplogroup R1a1.) Individuals from the Bell Beaker culture, the Únětice culture and contemporary Scandinavian cultures were also found to be closely genetically related to Corded Ware. A particularly high lactose tolerance was found among Corded Ware and the closely related Nordic Bronze Age. In addition, the study found samples from the Sintashta culture to be closely genetically related to the succeeding Andronovo culture.

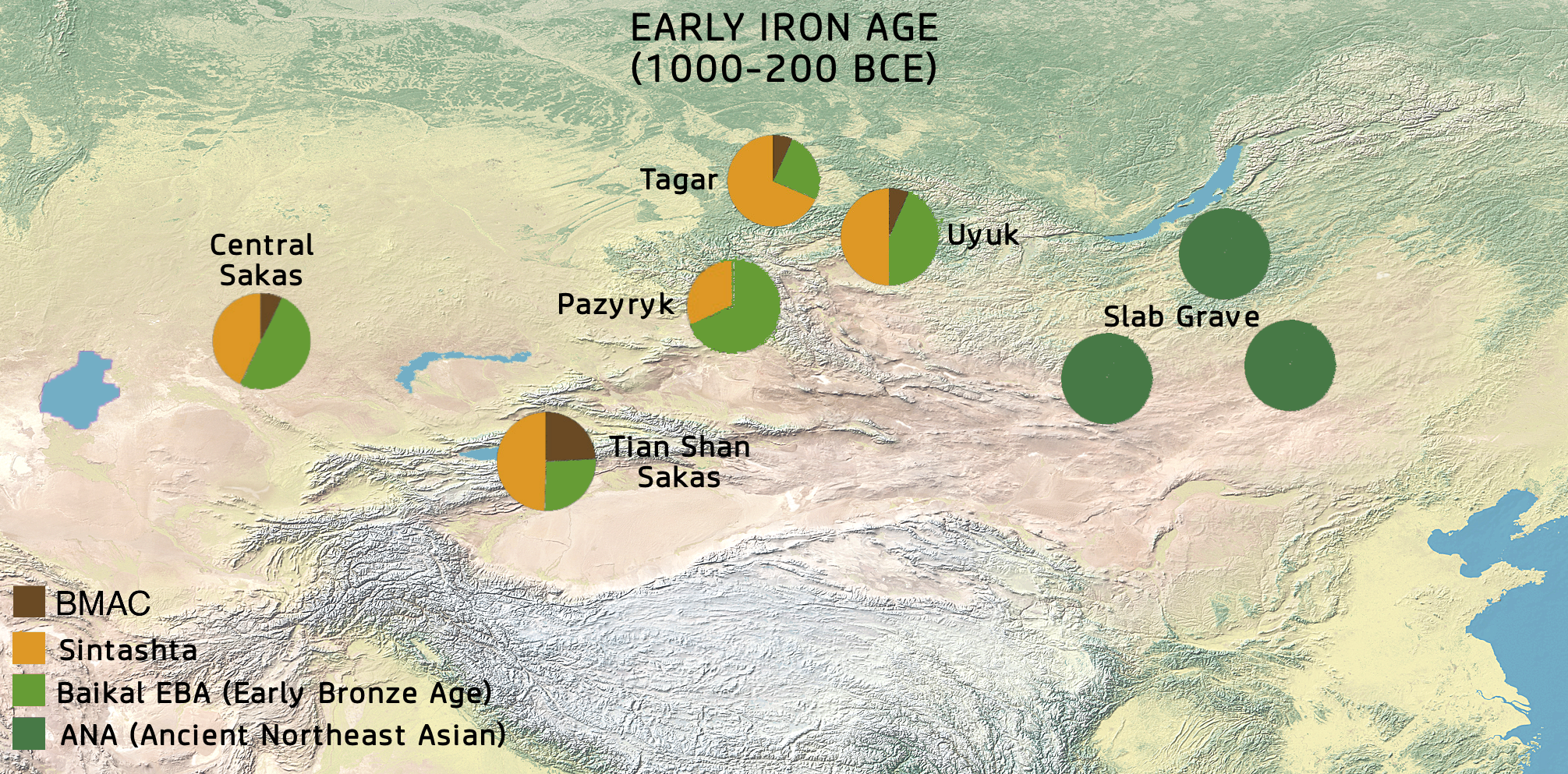
Sintashta ancestry ( ) in Southern Siberia, c. 800–200 BCE. Saka populations combined West Eurasian Sintashta, BMAC and East Eurasian Baikal EBA ancestry.

Narasimhan et al. 2019 analysed the remains of several individuals associated with the Sintashta culture. mtDNA was extracted from two females buried at the Petrovka settlement. They were found to be carrying subclades of U2 and U5. The remains of fifty individuals from the fortified Sintastha settlement cemetery of Kamennyi Ambar-5 was analysed. This was the largest sample of ancient DNA ever sampled from a single site. The Y-DNA from thirty males was extracted. Eighteen carried R1a and various subclades of it (particularly subclades of R1a-Z417): R1a-Z645 (4 individuals), R1a-Z93 (1), R1a-Z94 (1), R1a-Z2124 (4), R1a-Z2125 (1), R1a-Z2123 (1), and R1a-Y874* (1); five carried subclades of R1b (particularly subclades of R1b1a1a), two carried Q1a and a subclade of it, one carried I2a1a1a, and four carried unspecified R1 clades. The majority of mtDNA samples belonged to various subclades of U, while W, J, T, H and K also occurred. A Sintashta male buried at Samara was found to be carrying R1b1a1a2 and J1c1b1a. The authors of the study found the majority of Sintashta people (ca. 80%) to be closely genetically related to the people of the Corded Ware culture, the Srubnaya culture, the Potapovka culture, and the Andronovo culture. These were found to harbour mixed ancestry from the Yamnaya culture and peoples of the Central European Middle Neolithic, like the Globular Amphora culture. The remaining sampled Sintashta individuals belonged to various ancestral types different from the majority population, with affinities to earlier populations such as Eneolithic samples collected at Khvalynsk and hunter-gatherers from Tyumen Oblast in western Siberia. This indicates that the Sintashta settlement of Kamennyi Ambar was a cosmopolitan site that united a genetically heterogenous population in a single social group.

Estimates based on DATES (Distribution of Ancestry Tracts of Evolutionary Signals) suggest that genetic characteristics typical of the Sintashta culture formed by c. 3200 BCE.

In a sample of Sintashta remains from Central Asia, the majority of Sintashta specimens had light hair, while 46.2% had dark hair. With regards to eye colour, the majority had brown eyes while 30.8% had blue eyes.

=== Turkic expansion (2nd-3rd century CE) ===
A 2020 study found evidence for significant admixture from a Sintashta-related source in a sample of early Türkic remains from Mongolia. This western Eurasian admixture was shown to have a strong sex bias, indicating that it was inherited from more male than female ancestors, which is consistent with the decline of the paternal haplogroup Q1a and the rise of west-Eurasian paternal haplogroups in the early Türkic period of the East Eurasian steppe.

A 2023 study suggested that modelled Sintashta-like ancestry is a major component of modern-day Turkic populations, especially in the western part of the Eurasian continental mass.

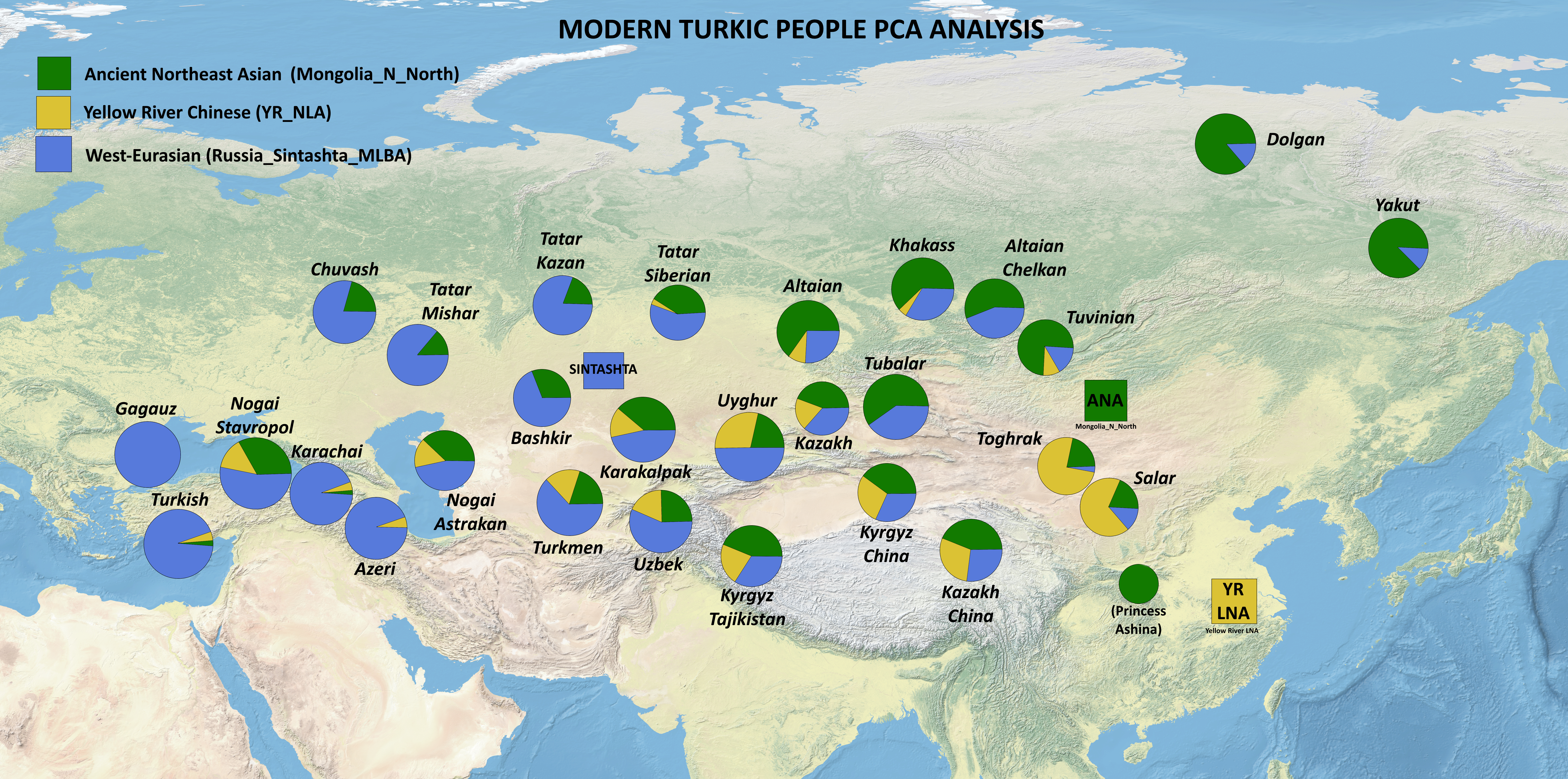
Modern Turkic People PCA Analysis, and modelled proportions of Ancient Northeast Asian ancestry (ANA, ), as well as Chinese Yellow River (YR_NLA, ) and Sintashta (for West Eurasian‐related, ) ancestry.

The same study found that Princess Ashina, a Göktürk, largely lacked the West Eurasian ancestry that was common in early Türkic populations on the Central Asian steppe. Early medieval and Central Asian Steppe Türks had no close affinity to Princess Ashina, suggesting that there was genetic substructure within the Türkic empire. The study likewise found that modern Türkic-speaking populations were highly diverse. The authors further stated: "...the limited contribution from ancient Göktürk found in modern Turkic speaking populations once again validates a cultural diffusion model over a demic diffusion model for the spread of Turkic languages."

== Horse genetics ==
The dispersal of the DOM2 genetic lineage, believed to be the ancestor of all modern domesticated horses, is linked with the populations which preceded the Sintashta culture and their expansions. Genetic studies suggest that these horses were selectively bred for desired traits including docility, stress tolerance, endurance running, and higher weight-carrying thresholds. According to Librado et al. (2021),

modern domestic horses ultimately replaced almost all other local populations as they expanded rapidly across Eurasia from about 2000 BC, synchronously with equestrian material culture, including Sintashta spoke-wheeled chariots ... the DOM2 genetic profile was ubiquitous among horses buried in Sintashta kurgans together with the earliest spoke-wheeled chariots around 2000–1800 BC. ... DOM2 dispersal in Asia during the early-to-mid second millennium BC was concurrent with the spread of chariotry and Indo-Iranian languages, whose earliest speakers are linked to populations that directly preceded the Sintashta culture.

== See also ==
The Sintashta culture, with contemporary cultures c. 2000 BC.
- Country of Towns
- Multi-cordoned ware culture
- Cimmerians
- Karasuk culture
- Gandhara culture
