= Lola culture =

Middle Bronze Age archaeological culture of the North Caucasus

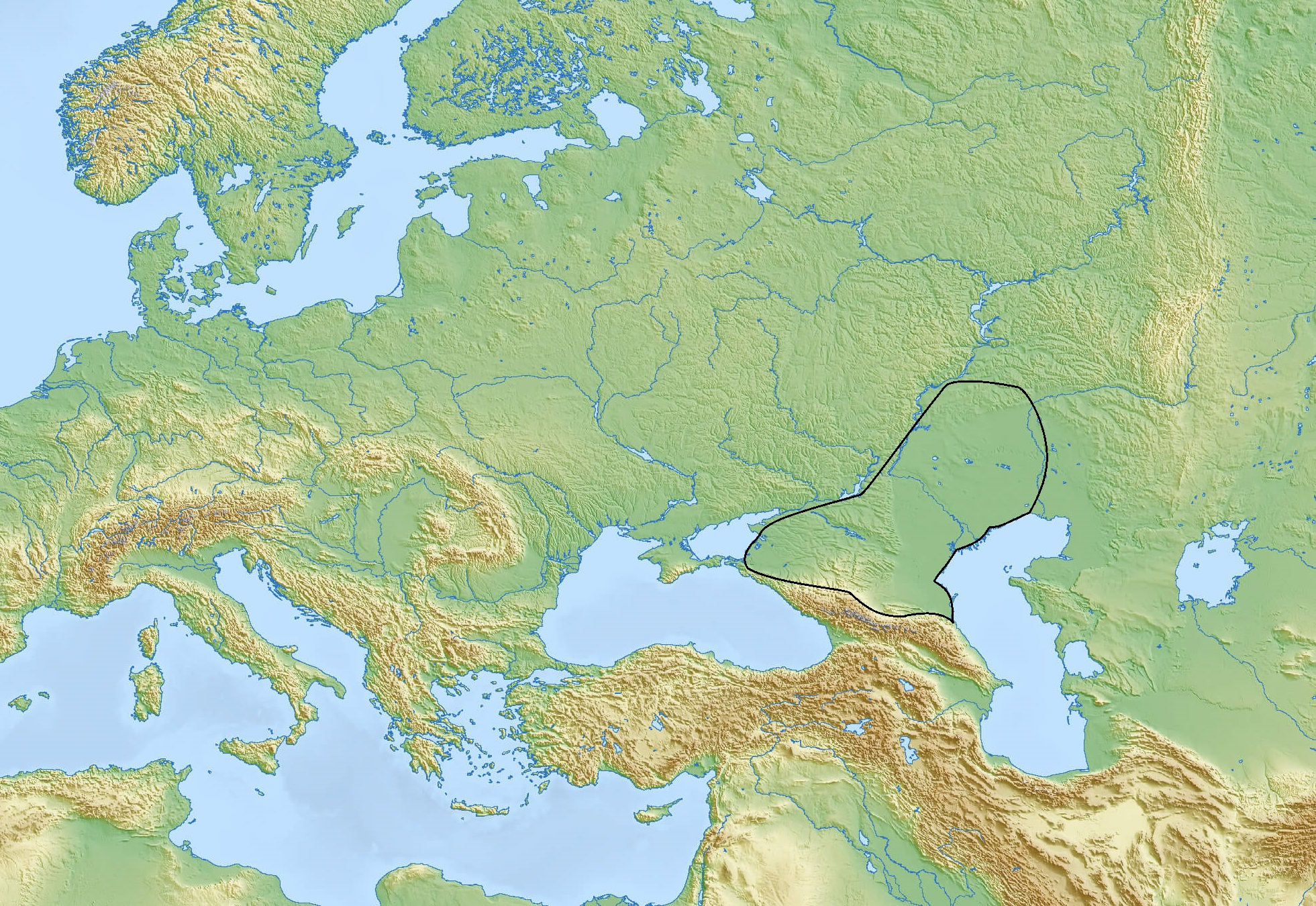
- Geographical range: North Caucasus and the Volga-Ural steppes
- Period: Middle Bronze Age
- Dates: ca. 2200–1800 BC
- Preceded by: Catacomb culture
- Followed by: Srubnaya culture

The Lola culture (Russian: Лолинская культура, romanized: Lolinskaya kul'tura) was a Middle Bronze Age culture which flourished in the North Caucasus and the Volga-Ural steppes ca. 2200 BC to 1800 BC.

== Chronology ==
The Lola culture emerged in the North Caucasus c. 2200 BC as a result of migrations of peoples from the east Caucasus. It replaces the local variants of the Catacomb culture. Its emerged during the 4.2-kiloyear event, which caused dramatic climatic changes, mass migrations of peoples and the collapse of several Old World empires. The period of the Lola culture is recognized as perhaps the most violent in the history of the Pontic-Caspian steppe. Evidence suggests that the emergence of the Lola culture was accompanied by significant violent conflict with the preceding Catacomb population, and peoples of the neighboring Multi-cordoned ware culture, who were migrants from East-Central Europe. Traces of trade and violent conflict with peoples of the Ginchi culture has also been detected.

In the early 2nd millennium BC, the Lola culture came under increasing pressure from the Srubnaya culture, who were advancing from the Middle Volga region. By 1800 BC, the Lola culture had been replaced by the Srubnaya.

== Characteristics ==
The Lola culture is known from its burials. Lola people were buried in kurgans crouched on their side. The Lola economy was based on sheep herding. No settlements are known.

== Physical anthropology ==
The population of the post-Catacomb cultures are characterized by a narrow, high and sharply profiled skull, which was historically characteristic of peoples of the Caucasus. The physical type of the Lola population is very different from that of the Catacomb population, which suggests an almost complete population replacement of the Catacomb by the Lola. A significantly different physical type is in turn observed among the Srubnaya, which further suggests yet another population replacement of the Lola population by the Srubnaya.

== Genetics ==
Wang et al. 2019 identified in a Lola male the paternal haplogroup Q1a2 and the maternal haplogroup R1b. He genetically resembled people of the preceding Steppe Maykop culture, who are characterized by relatively high levels of genetic affinity with the people of Afontova Gora and Kennewick Man. Notably, Q-M346 does not exist in the current ISOGG tree, and all other sources give Q-MBY72936=Q1b.

== Sources ==
- Balabanova, Mariya A. (2020). "Cultural and Morphological Differentiation of the Population of the Middle Bronze Age in the Lower Volga Region and Adjacent Territories". Science Journal of VolSU. History. Area Studies. International Relations. 25 (4): 51–64. doi:10.15688/jvolsu4.2020.4.3.
- Kazarnitsky, A. A. (2021). "The Ratio of Indigenous to Immigrant Populations in the Western Steppe During the Bronze Age (Based on Cranial Data)". Archaeology, Ethnology & Anthropology of Eurasia. 49 (3): 120–135. doi:10.17746/1563-0110.2021.49.3.127-135.
- Mimikhod, Roman; Zagorodnia, Olga (2021). "Evidence of injuries and killings in the post-catacomb world (22,000-18,000 ca. BC)". In Shvedchikova, Tatyana; Moghaddam, Negahnaz; Barrone, Pier Matteo (eds.). Crimes in the Past: Archaeological and Anthropological Evidence. Archaeopress. p. 58-71. ISBN 978-1-78969-778-0.
- Wang, Chuan-Chao; et al. (February 4, 2019). "Ancient human genome-wide data from a 3000-year interval in the Caucasus corresponds with eco-geographic regions". Nature Communications. 10 (590). Nature Research. doi:10.1038/s41467-018-08220-8. PMC 6360191. PMID 30713341.
