= Catacomb culture =

Bronze age steppe culture, 2500–1950 BC

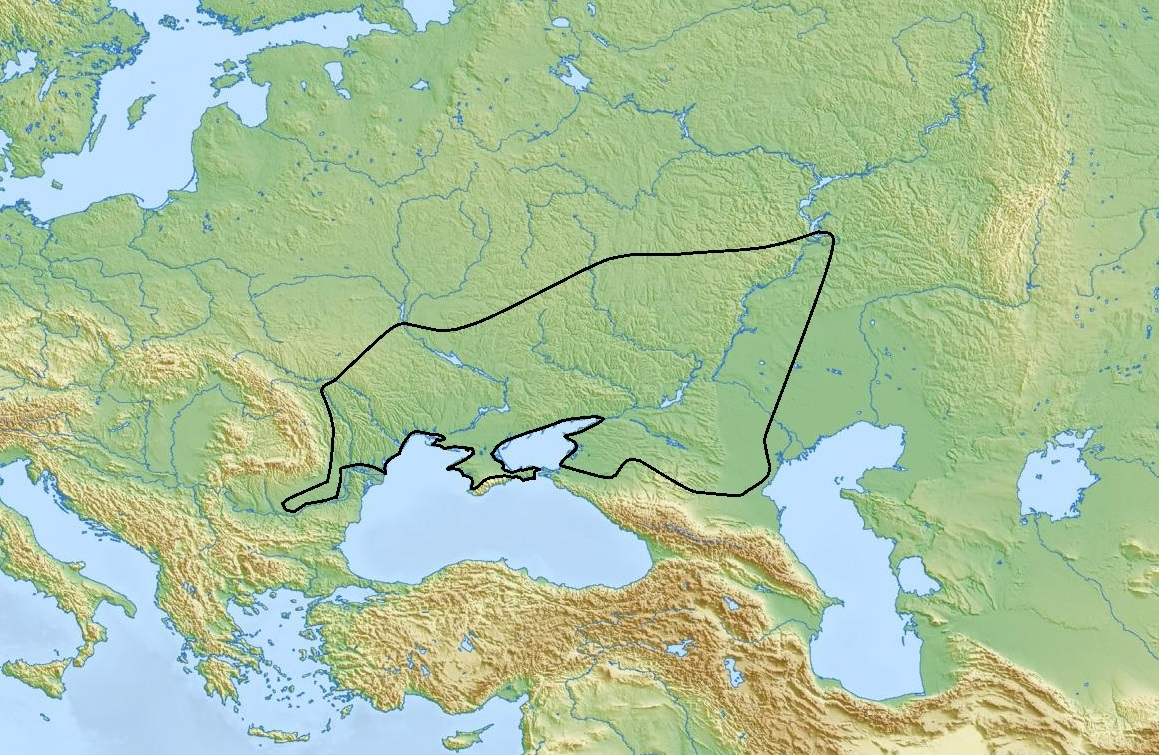
- Geographical range: Pontic steppe
- Period: Bronze Age
- Dates: ca. 2500–1950 BC
- Preceded by: Yamnaya culture
- Followed by: Abashevo culture, Lola culture, Multi-cordoned ware culture, Srubnaya culture

The Catacomb culture (Russian: Катакомбная культура, romanized: Katakombnaya kul'tura, Ukrainian: Катакомбна культура, romanized: Katakombna kul'tura) was a Bronze Age archaeological culture which flourished on the Pontic steppe in 2,500–1,950 BC.

Originating on the southern steppe as an outgrowth of the Yamnaya culture, the Catacomb culture came to cover a large area. It was probably Indo-European-speaking, with some linguists associating it with Tocharian. Influences of the Catacomb culture have been suggested to be found as far as Italy, Greece, and Syria. It spawned the Multi-cordoned ware culture and was eventually succeeded by the Srubnaya culture.

== Origins ==
The Catacomb culture emerged on the southern part of the Pontic steppe in 2,500 BC, as a western descendant of the Yamnaya culture. Influences from the west appear to have had a decisive role on the formation of the Catacomb culture.

In addition to the Yamnaya culture, the Catacomb culture displays links with the earlier Sredny Stog culture, the Afanasievo culture and the Poltavka culture.

== Distribution ==
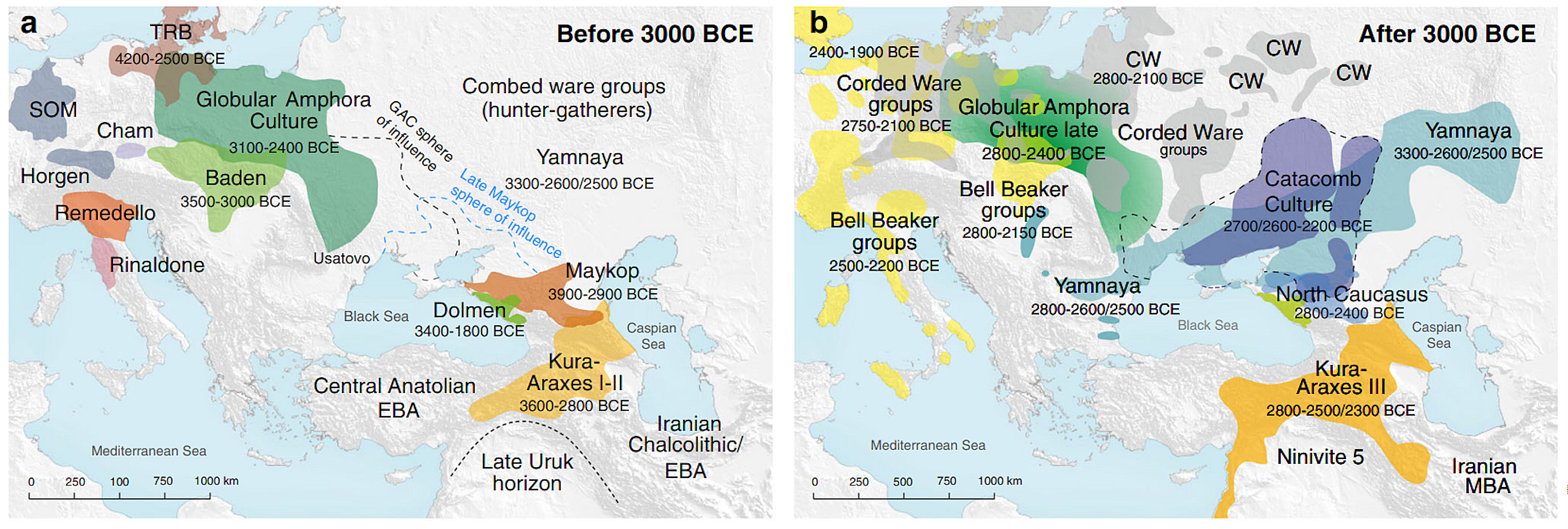
The Catacomb culture ( ) with other archaeological cultures in Europe and Caucasus before and after 3000 BC.

The Catacomb culture was distributed on the Pontic steppe, an area that had earlier been occupied by the Yamnaya culture. This was a large area, and on the basis of ceramic styles and burial practices, regional variants have been found. On this basis, the Catacomb culture has by some been designated as a "cultural-historical area" with the regional variants classified as distinct cultures in their own respect.

In the east the Catacomb culture neighbored the Poltavka culture, which was an eastern descendant of the Yamnaya culture. The Catacomb culture influenced the development of the Poltavka culture. Throughout its existence, the Catacomb culture expanded eastward and northward.

Elena Efimovna Kuzmina suggests that the Seima-Turbino phenomenon emerged as a result of interaction between the Abashevo culture, the Catacomb culture and the early Andronovo culture.

Evidence of Catacomb influence has been discovered far outside of the Pontic steppe. Its burial chambers, metal types and figurines are very similar to those appearing in Italy and the eastern Mediterranean, while the hammer-head pin, a characteristic ornament of the Catacomb culture, has been found in Central Europe and Italy. Based on these similarities, migrations or cultural diffusion from the Catacomb culture to these areas have been suggested. Similarities between the Catacomb culture and Mycenaean Greece are particularly striking. These include types of socketed spear-heads, types of cheekpieces for horses, and the custom of making masks for the dead.

The Lola culture emerged in the North Caucasus c. 2200 BC as a result of migrations of peoples from the east Caucasus. It replaced the local variants of the Catacomb culture.

== Characteristics ==
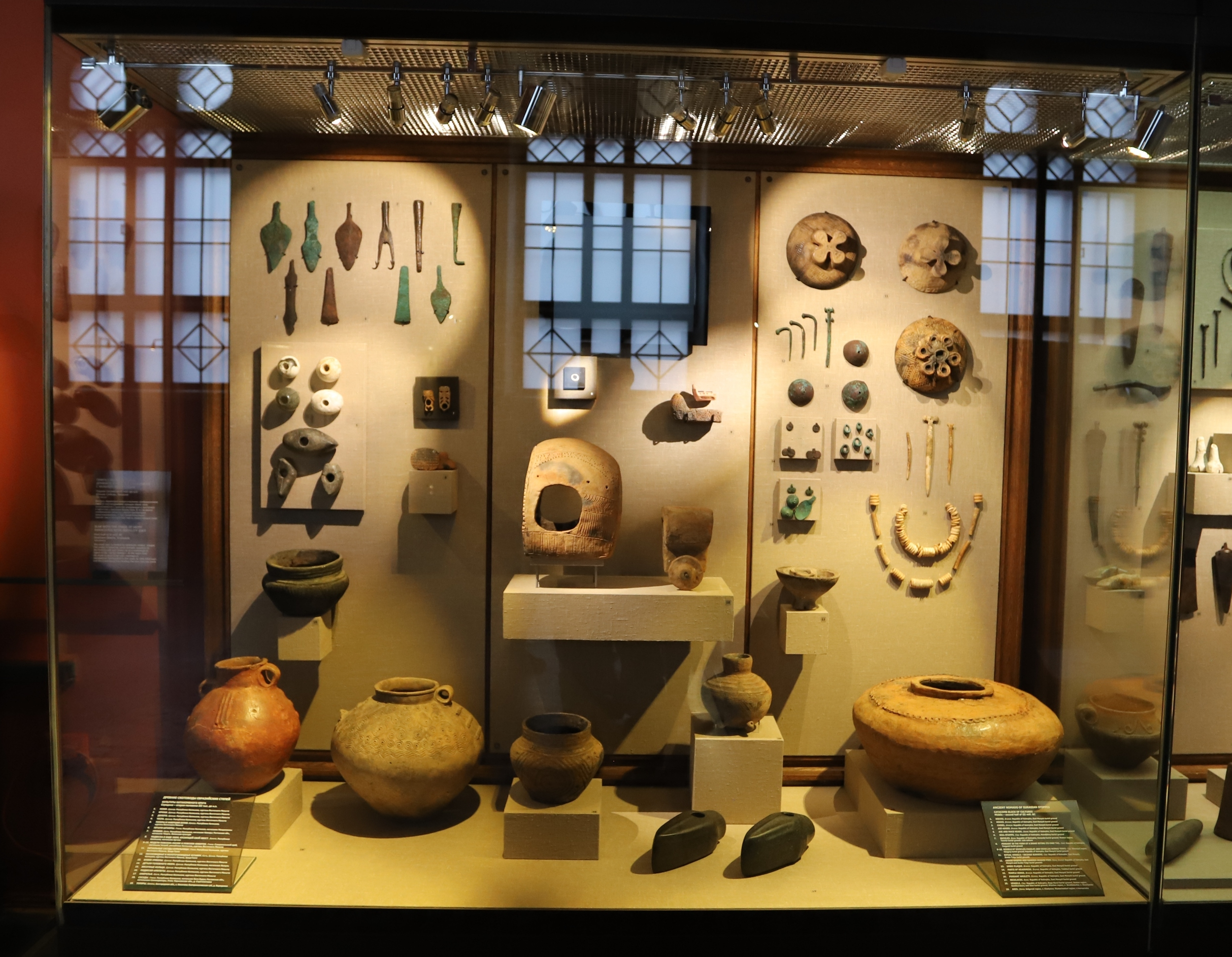
Catacomb culture artefacts at the Moscow State Historical Museum

=== Burials ===
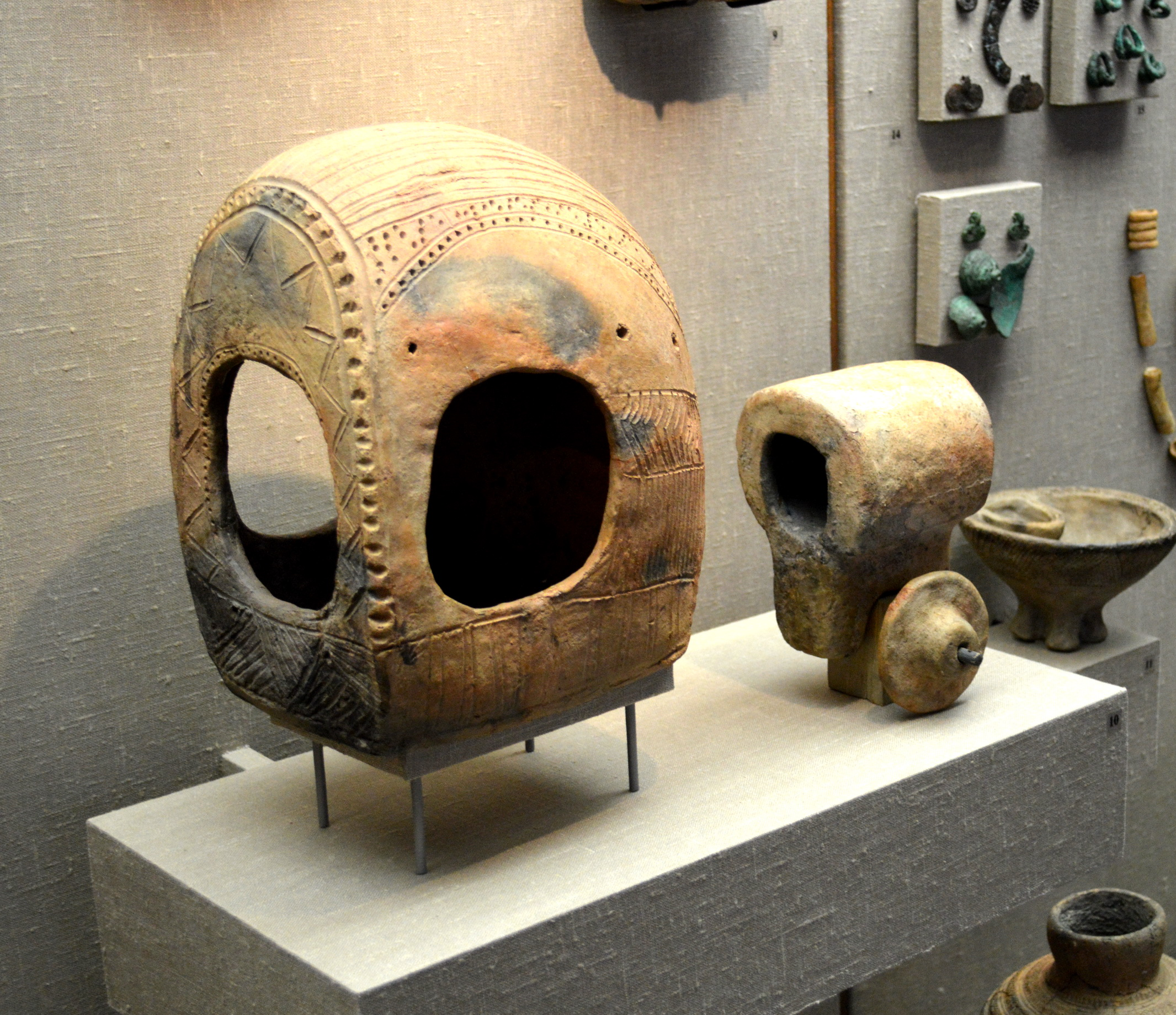
Catacomb culture wagon models.

The Catacomb culture is named for its burials. These augmented the shaft grave of the Yamnaya culture with a burial niche at its base. This is the so-called catacomb. Such graves have also been found in Mycenaean Greece and parts of Eastern Europe. (Note: "Catacomb Culture was a regional variety with deep catacomb-shaped graves, some also found in Eastern Europe and Greece.")

Deceased Catacomb individuals were typically buried in a flexed position on their right side. They were often accompanied by ornaments such as silver rings, and weapons such as stone and metal axes, arrows, daggers and maces.

Animal sacrifices, including head and hooves of goats, sheep, horses and cattle, occur in about 16% of Catacomb graves. Cattle sacrifices in the Catacomb culture are more frequent than in the Yamnaya culture. Similar horse burials also appeared in the earlier Khvalynsk culture, and in the Poltavka culture.

Catacomb burials are occasionally covered with Kurgan stelae. This practice was also common in the Yamnaya culture. Some three hundred stelae have been found from the Yamnaya culture and the Catacomb culture.

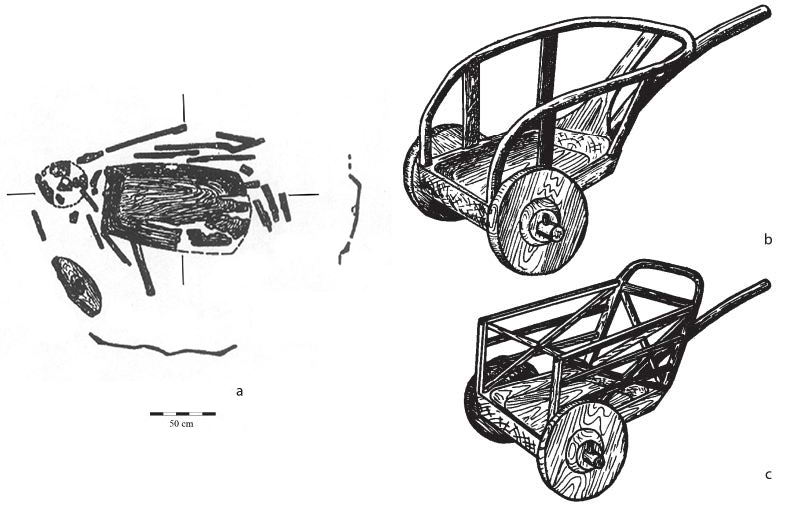
Catacomb culture two-wheeled vehicle, reconstruction.

Catacomb burials are sometimes accompanied by wheeled vehicles. Such wagon burials are attested in the earlier Yamnaya culture, and later among Iranian peoples (Scythians), Celts, and Italic peoples.

Aspects of the burial rite of the Catacomb culture have been detected in the Bishkent culture of southern Tajikistan.

In some cases, the skull of deceased Catacomb people was modelled in clay. This involved the filling of the mouth, ears and nasal cavity with clay and modeling the surface features of the face. This practice is associated with high-status burials containing prestige items. The practice was performed on men, women, and children. It has been suggested that these clay masks may have served as a prototype for the later gold masks found in Mycenaean Greece.

=== Economy ===
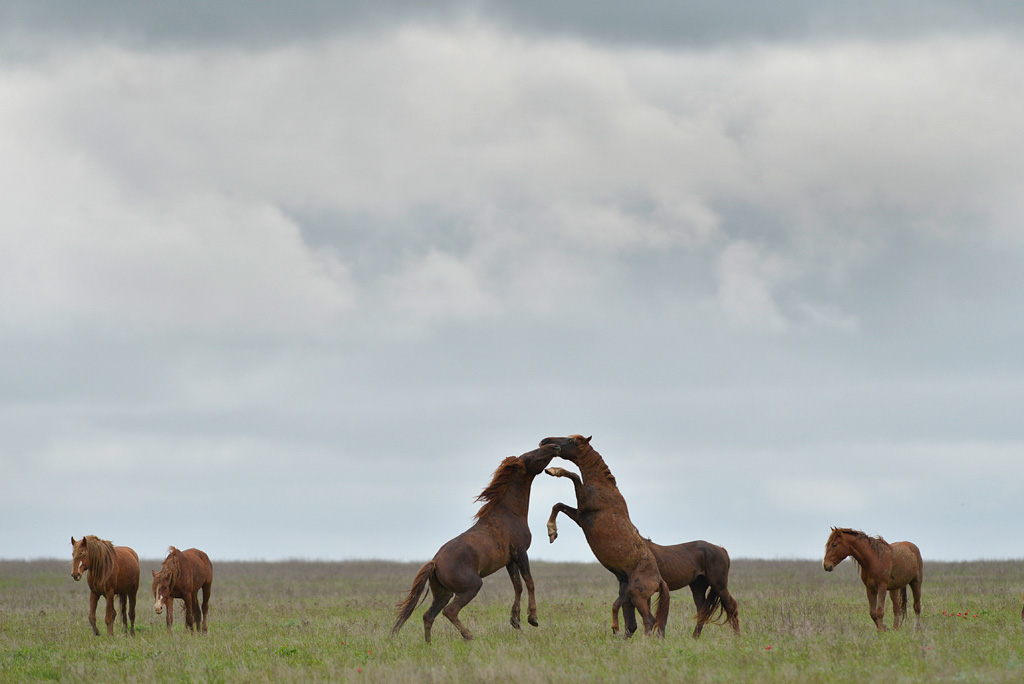
Horses were domesticated on the Pontic-Caspian steppe.

The economy of the Catacomb culture has been based mostly on stockbreeding. Remains of cattle, sheep, goat, horse and some pigs have been found. Plant remains are exceedingly rare, but traces of wheat, such as einkorn and emmer, have been found. Wooden ploughs have been found at Catacomb burials, indicating that agriculture was practiced.

The types of tools used by the Catacomb people suggest that the culture included several craft specialists, including weavers, bronze workers and weapons manufacturers. Similar metal types to those of the Catacomb culture later appears among the Abashevo culture.

=== Settlements ===
Little evidence of Catacomb settlements has been found. These are mostly seasonal camp-sites located near sources of water.

A larger settlement has been found at Matveyevka on the southern Bug. It has three large structures with foundations of stone. On the island of Bayda in the Dnieper river, a stone-built fortress of the late Catacomb period with a surrounding ditch has been found.

=== Ceramics ===
Catacomb ceramics are more elaborate than those of the Yamnaya culture. Low footed vessels that have been discovered in female burials are believed to have been used in rituals that included the use of narcotic substances such as hemp.

Catacomb ceramics appears to have influenced the ceramics of the Abashevo culture and the Sintashta culture.

=== Weapons ===
Evidence of early composite bows have been yielded from the Catacomb culture. Quivers with space for ten to twenty arrows have also been found. Its arrowheads may have influenced those of the Sintashta culture.

Its hollow-based flint arrowheads are similar to those of the Middle Dnieper culture. Stone battle-axes of the Catacomb culture are similar to those of the Fatyanovo–Balanovo culture.

A knife from ca. 2,500 BC ascribed to the Catacomb culture in the Donets had a handle of arsenical bronze and a blade made of iron.

=== Other characteristics ===
Wheeled vehicles have been found in Catacomb burials.

Bronze warty beads of the Catacomb culture are similar to those of the Sintashta culture.

Certain variants of the Catacomb culture, particularly those centered at the Donets, appear to have practiced cranial deformation. This may have been an aesthetic device or an ethnic marker. Around 9% of Catacomb skulls had holes drilled into them. This appears to have been associated with a ritual or medical practice.

Remains of bears have been found at Catacomb sites.

== Gallery ==
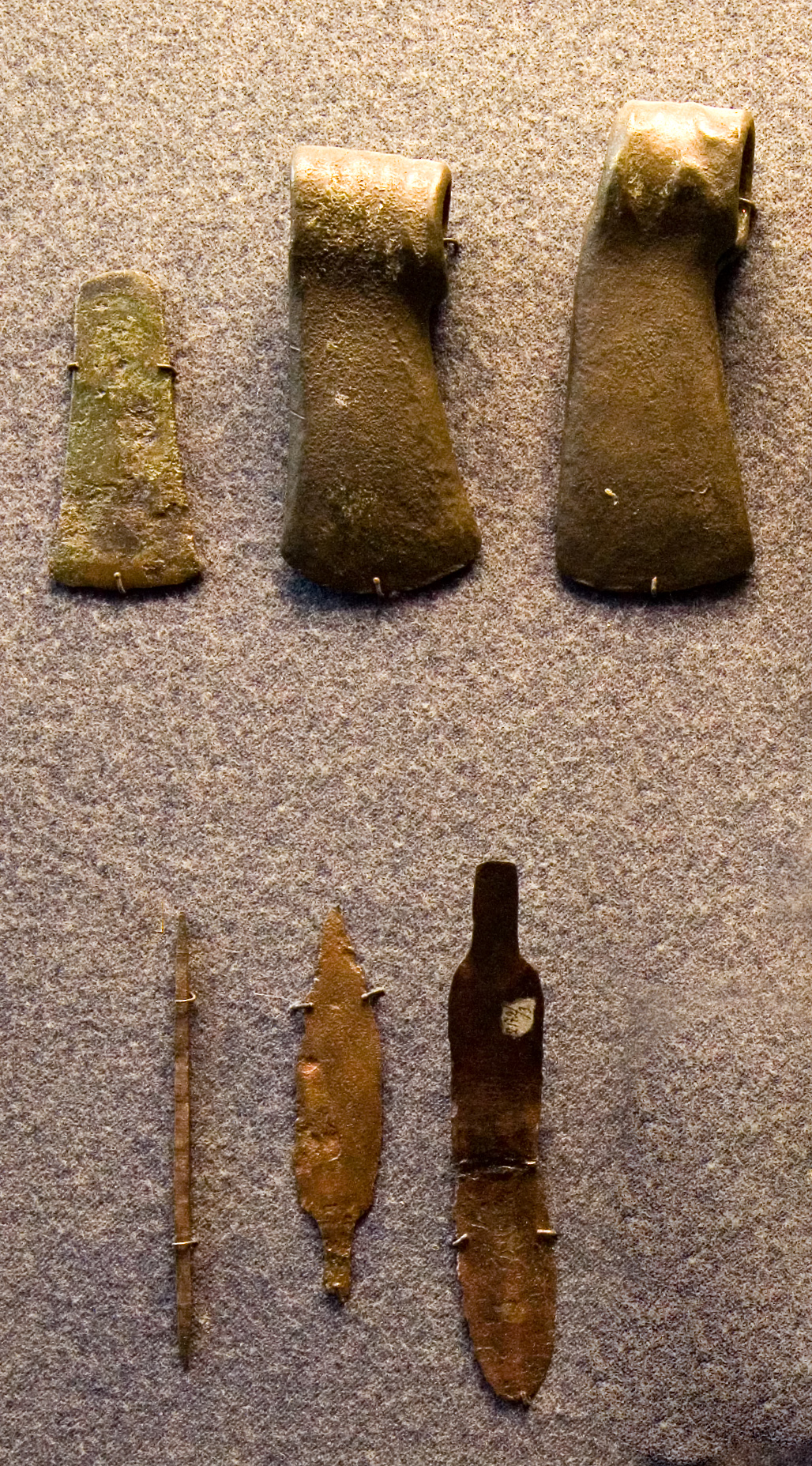
Shaft-hole axes and spearheads

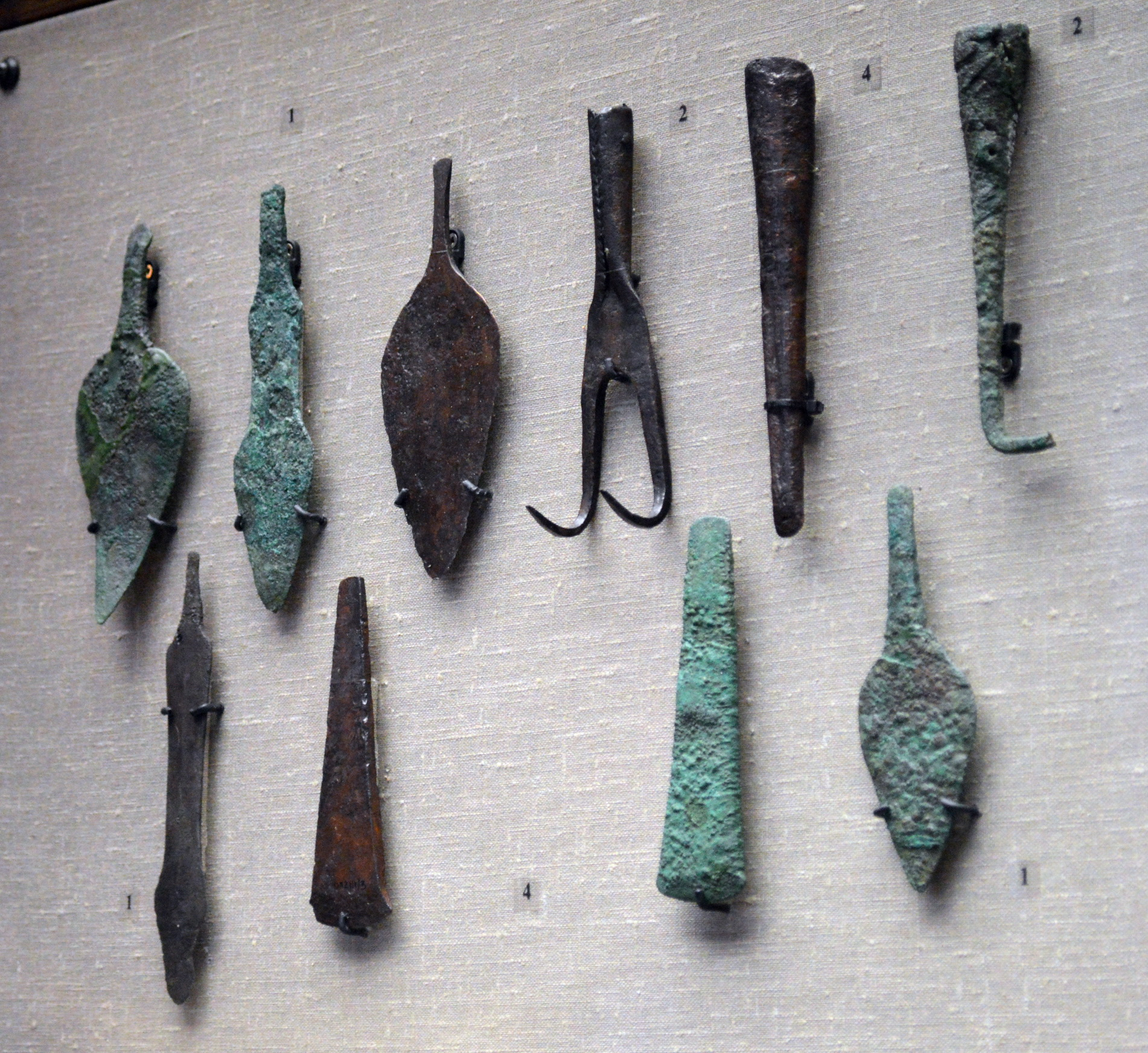
Bronze tools and weapons

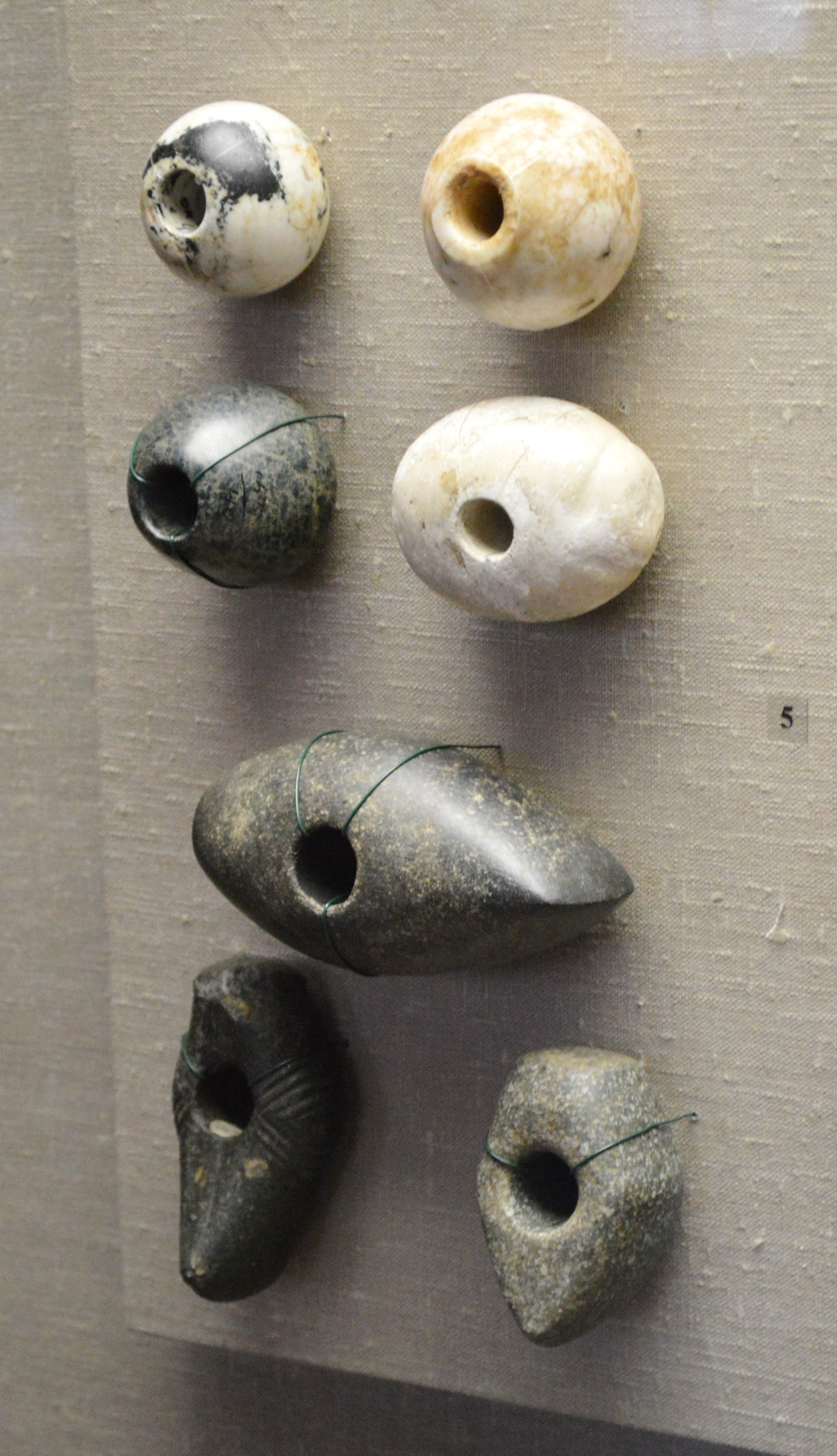
Stone axes and maceheads

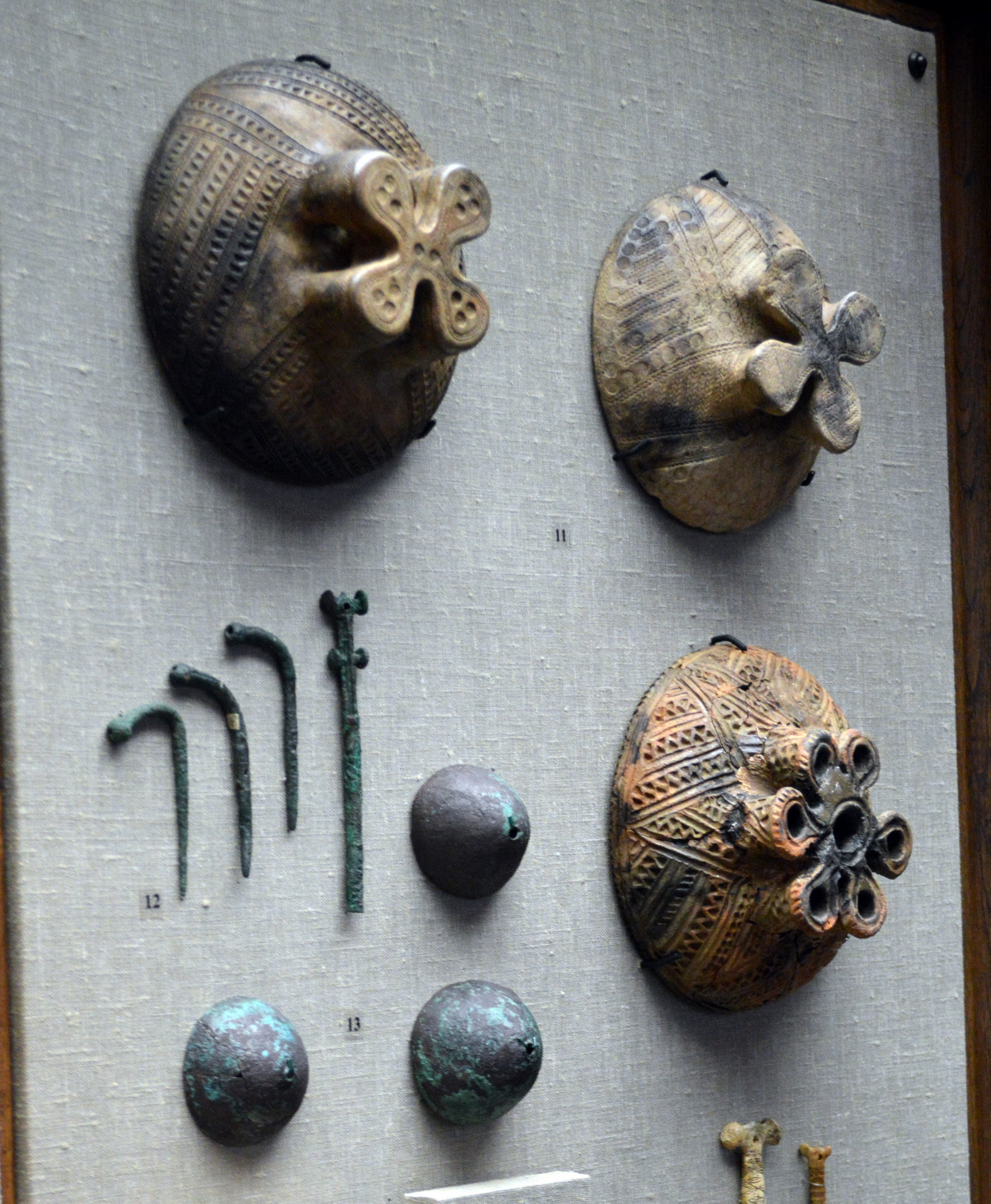
Ceramic censers and metal artefacts

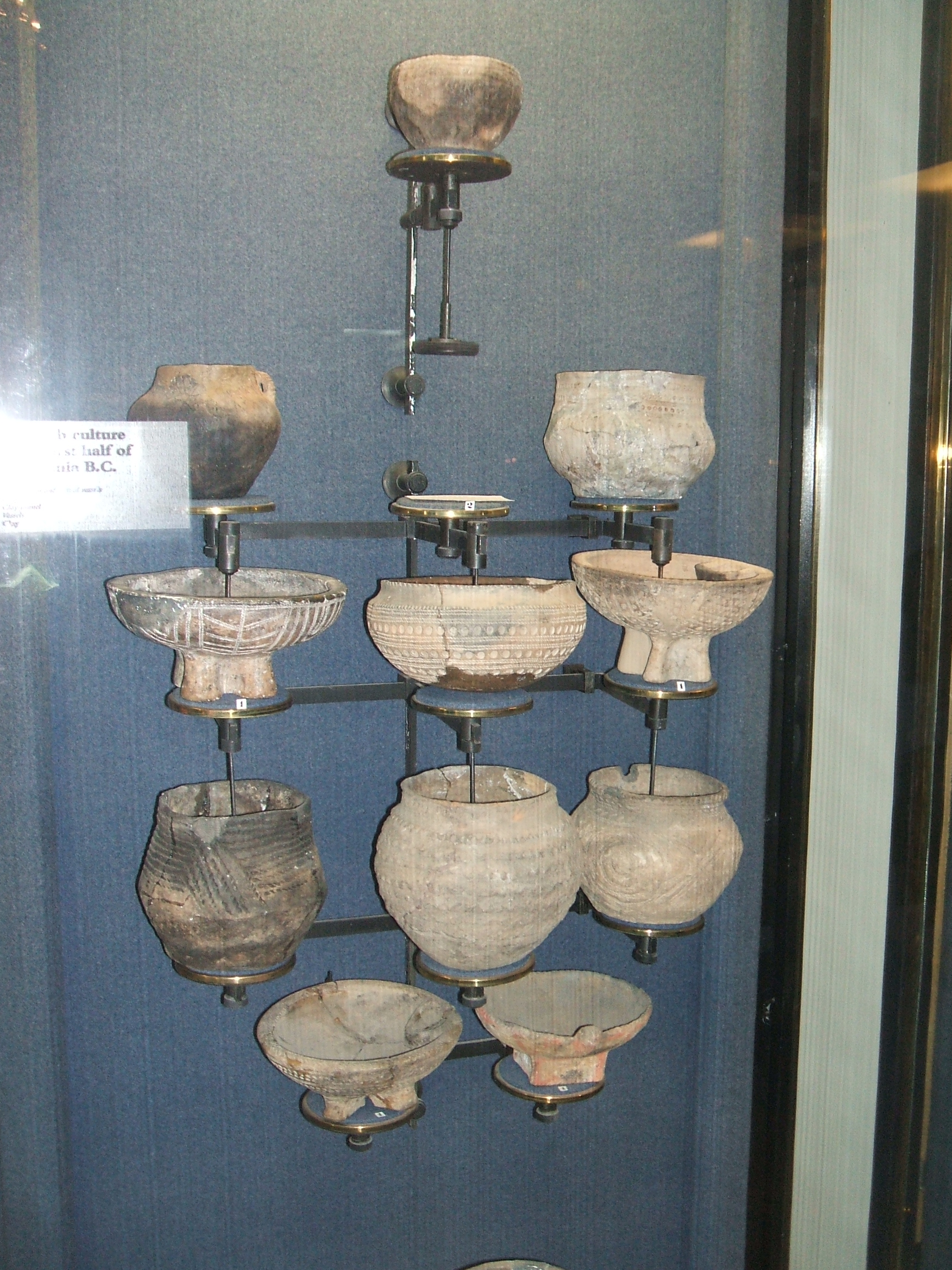
Catacomb ceramics

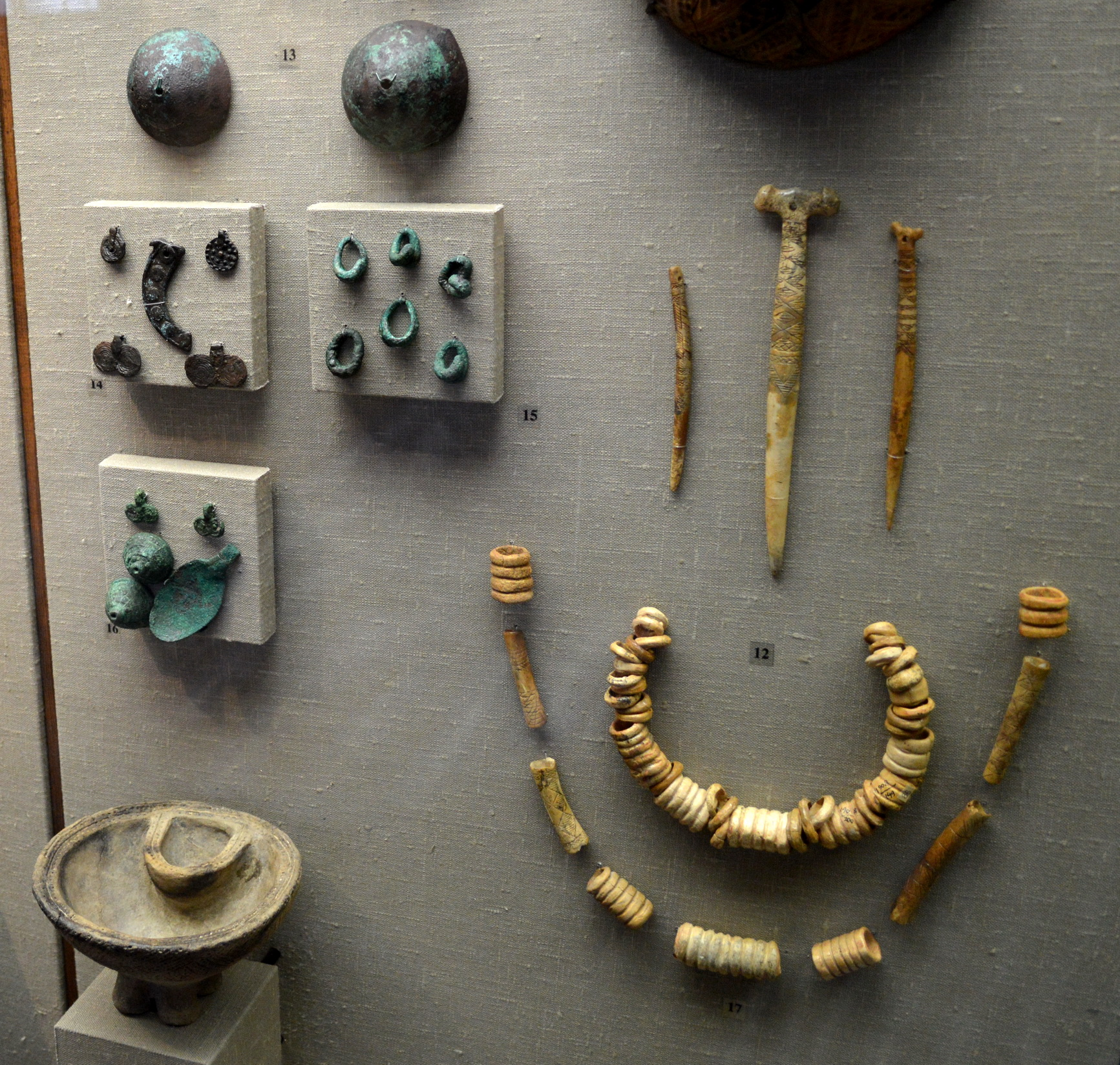
Various artefacts

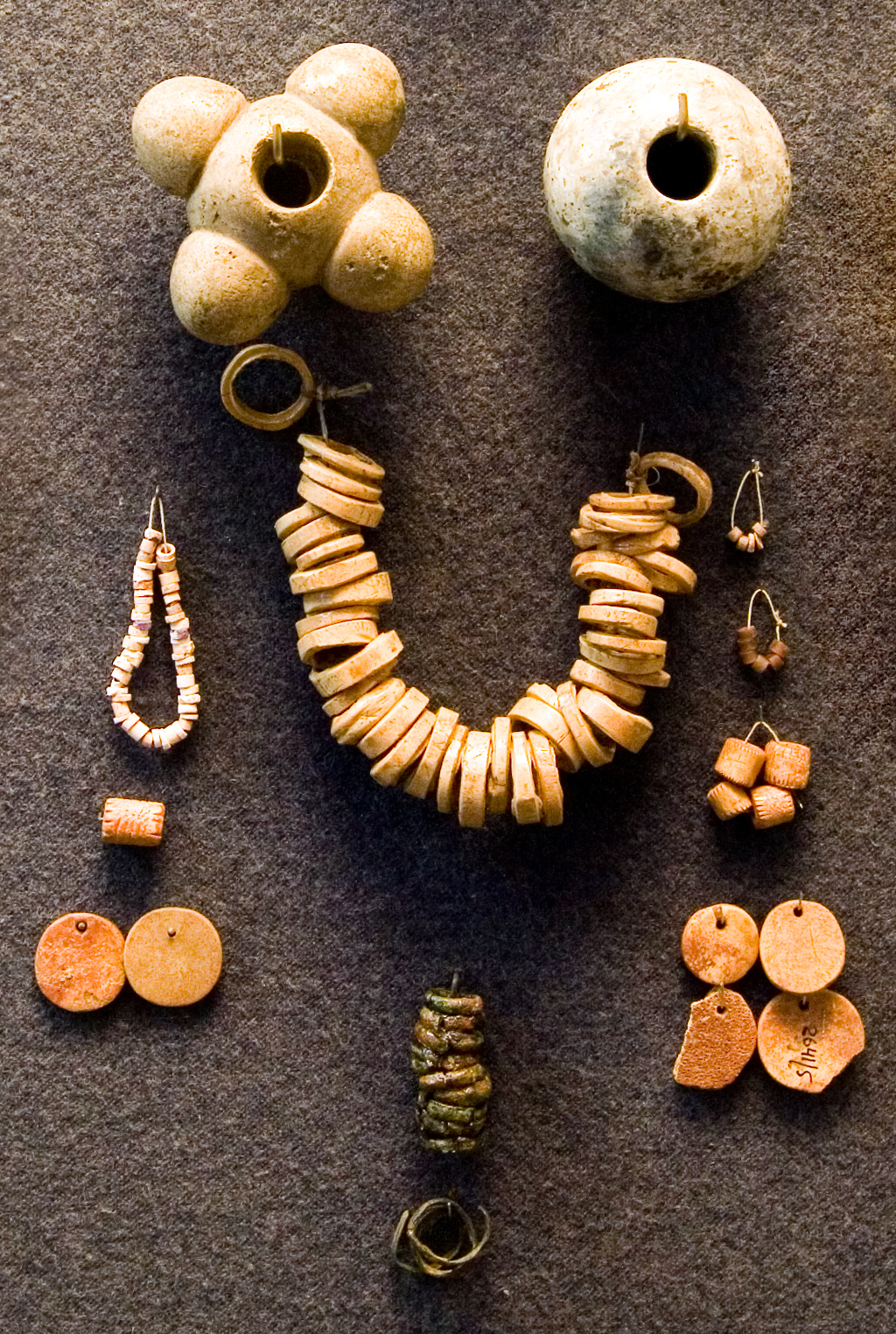
Beads and buttons

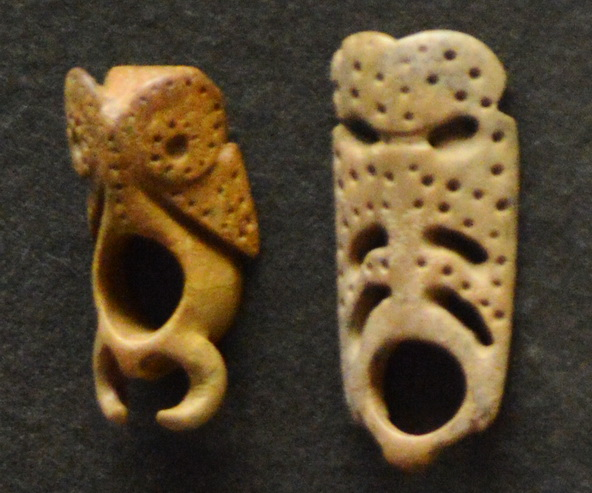
Buckles made from bone

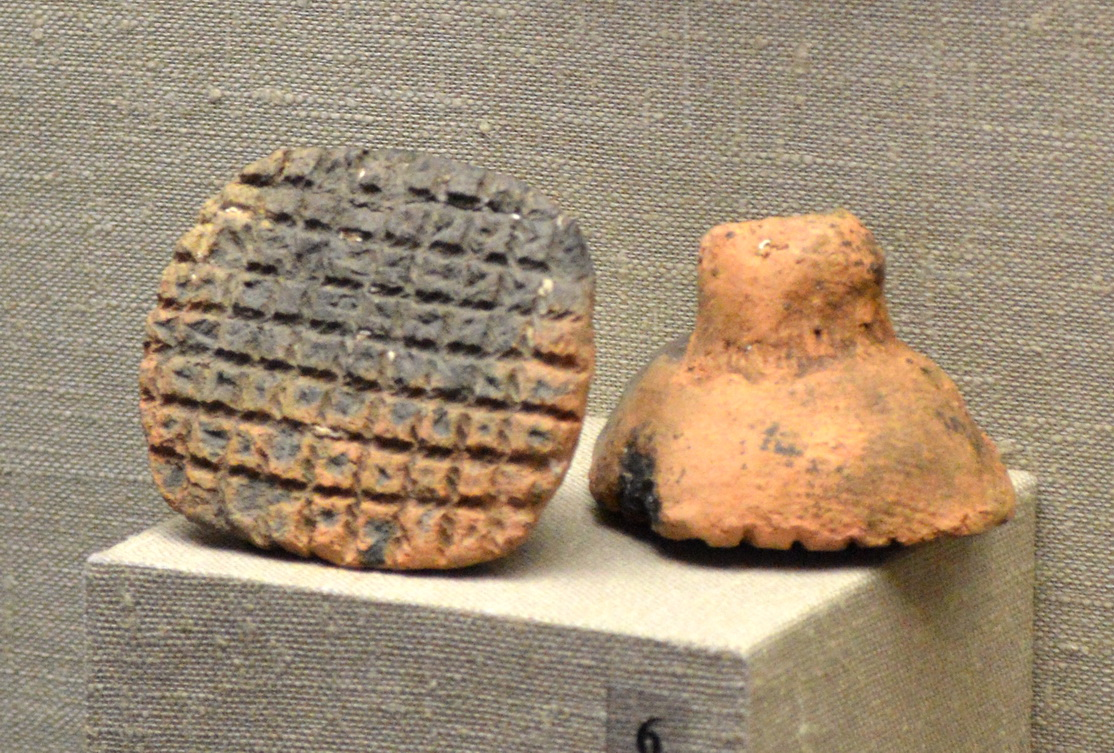
Clay stamp

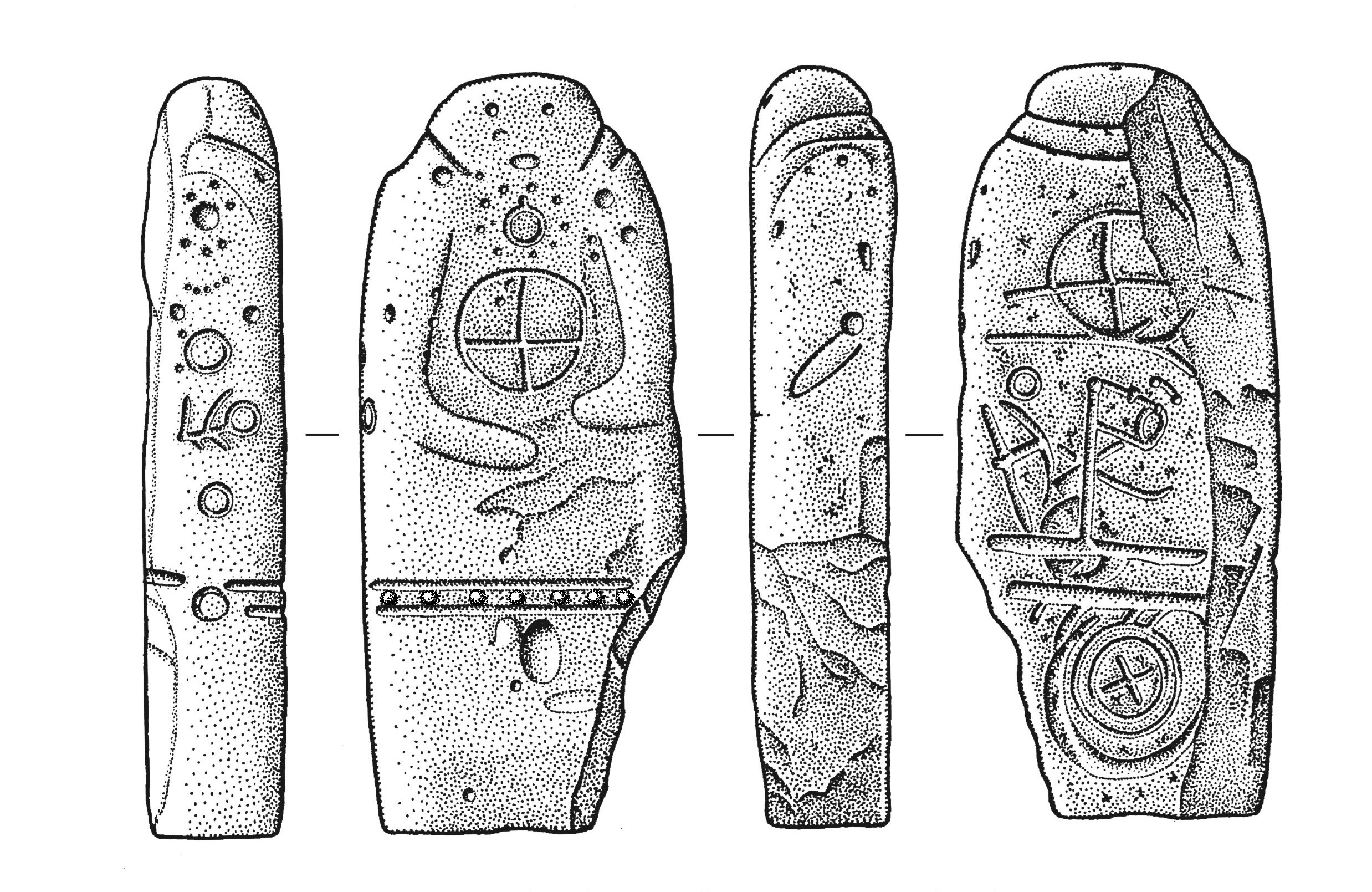
Stone stele

== Demographics ==
The Catacomb culture is estimated to have included some 50,000-60,000 individuals.

== Physical type ==
The Catacomb people were massively built Caucasoids/Europoids. Their skulls are similar to those of the Potapovka culture. (Note: Skulls from Potapovka burials belong to the massive proto-Europoid type and are similar to the earlier Catacomb and genetically follow the Timber-grave and west Andronovo, but differ from Abashevo.) Potapovka skulls are less dolichocephalic than those of the Fatyanovo–Balanovo culture, Abashevo culture, Sintashta culture, Srubnaya culture and Andronovo culture. The physical type of the Potapovka appears to have emerged through a mixture between the strongly dolichocephalic type of the Sintashta, and the less dolichocephalic type of the Yamnaya culture and Poltavka culture. (Note: "[M]assive broad-faced proto-Europoid type is a trait of post-Mariupol' cultures, Sredniy Stog, as well as the Pit-grave culture of the Dnieper's left bank, the Donets, and Don... During the period of the Timber-grave culture the population of the Ukraine was represented by the medium type between the dolichocephalous narrow-faced population of the Multi-roller Ware culture (Babino) and the more massive broad-faced population of the Timber-grave culture of the Volga region... The anthropological data confirm the existence of an impetus from the Volga region to the Ukraine in the formation of the Timber-grave culture. During the Belozerka stage the dolichocranial narrow-faced type became the prevalent one. A close affinity among the skulls of the Timber-grave, Belozerka, and Scythian cultures of the Pontic steppes, on the one hand, and of the same cultures of the forest-steppe region, on the other, has been shown... This proves the genetical continuity between the Iranian-speeking Scythian population and the previous Timber-grave culture population in the Ukraine... The heir of the Neolithic Dnieper-Donets and Sredniy Stog cultures was the Pit-grave culture. Its population possessed distinct Europoid features, was tall, with massive skulls... The tribes of the Abashevo culture appear in the forest-steppe zone, almost simultaneously with the Poltavka culture. The Abashevans are marked by dolichocephaly and narrow faces. This population had its roots in the Balanovo and Fatyanovo cultures on the Middle Volga, and in Central Europe... [T]he early Timber-grave culture (the Potapovka) population was the result of the mixing of different components. One type was massive, and its predecessor was the Pit-grave-Poltavka type. The second type was a dolichocephalous Europoid type genetically related to the Sintashta population... One more participant of the ethno-cultural processes in the steppes was that of the tribes of the Pokrovskiy type. They were dolichocephalous narrow-faced Europoids akin to the Abashevans and different from the Potapovkans... The majority of Timber-grave culture skulls are dolichocranic with middle-broad faces. They evidence the significant role of Pit-grave and Poltavka components in the Timber-grave culture population... One may assume a genetic connection between the populations of the Timber-grave culture of the Urals region and the Alakul' culture of the Urals and West Kazakhstan belonging to a dolichocephalous narrow-face type with the population of the Sintashta culture... [T]he western part of the Andronovo culture population belongs to the dolichocranic type akin to that of the Timber-grave culture.)

The people of the Catacomb culture have been described as "stockier and had more brachycephalic crania" than individuals belonging to the Yamnaya culture."

== Genetics ==
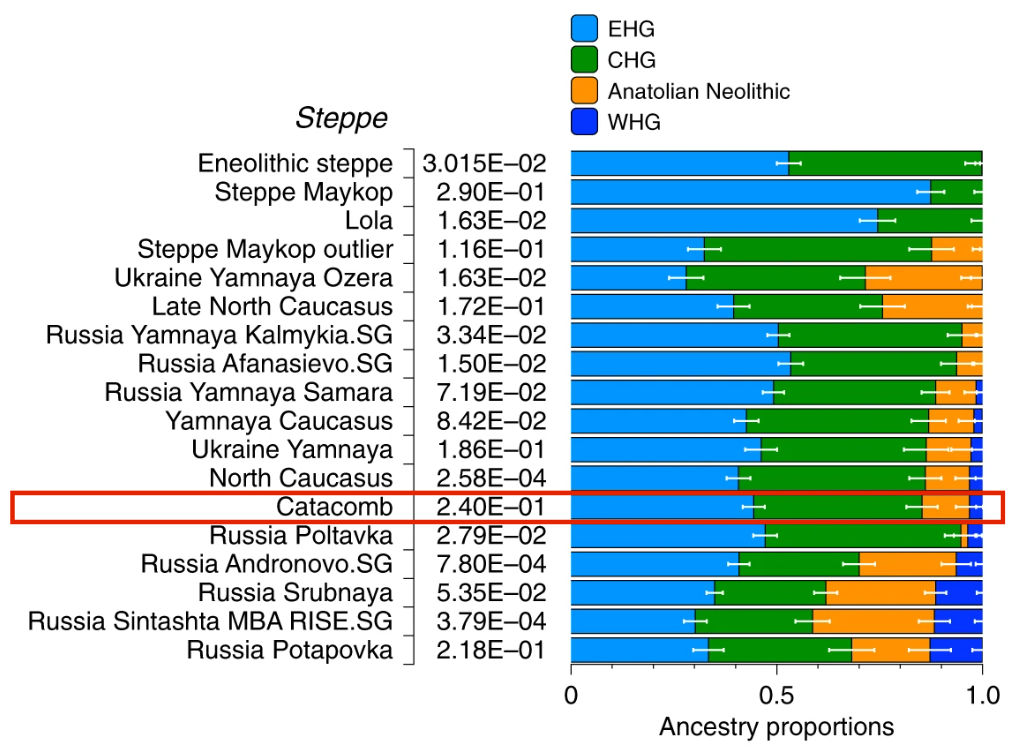
Admixture proportions of Catacomb culture populations. They combined Eastern Hunter Gatherer ( EHG), Caucasian Hunter-Gatherer ( CHG), Anatolian Neolithic ( ) and Western Hunter Gatherer ( WHG) ancestry. and were very close to other populations such as the Yamnaya.

Pashnik et al. (2014) analyzed the DNA of the remains of 28 Catacomb individuals. Their maternal haplogroups U5 and U4 appeared in higher frequencies than in the preceding Yamnaya culture. Haplogroups U5 and U4 are typical of Western Hunter-Gatherers and Eastern Hunter-Gatherers. Moreover, a generic similarity between Catacomb people and northern hunter-gatherers, particularly the people of the Pitted Ware culture of southern Scandinavia, was detected. It was suggested that the Catacomb people and the Yamnaya people were not as genetically admixed as previously believed. Interestingly, the modern population of Ukraine was found to be more closely related to people of the Yamnaya culture than people of the Catacomb culture.

Similarly, Nikitin et al. (2017), and Juras et al. (2018) found haplogroup U5 and U5a. These and other subclades of haplogroup U have been found in high frequencies among early hunter-gatherers of Northern Europe and Eastern Europe. From the Mesolithic they appear among populations of the Pontic steppe, including the Sredny Stog culture, the Yamnaya culture, the Corded Ware culture, the Andronovo culture, the Srubnaya culture and the Scythians. This suggests continuity of mtDNA among populations of the Pontic steppe going back at least to the Bronze Age.

In a genetic study published in Scientific Reports in 2018, the remains of two individuals from the Catacomb culture were analyzed. Both were found to belong to haplogroup X4. They are the first ancient individuals that have been identified with this lineage, which is very rare among modern populations.

In a February 2019 study published in Nature Communications, the remains of five individuals ascribed to the Catacomb culture were analyzed. Three males were found to be carrying R1b1a2. With regards to mtDNA, all five individuals carried various subclades of haplogroup U (particularly U5 and U4).

== Linguistics ==
David Anthony (2007: 306) assumes that the Catacomb culture was Indo-European-speaking. It has sometimes been considered ancestral to Indo-Iranian or Thracian. Other scholars have suggested that the culture provided a common background for Greek, Armenian and Indo-Iranian.

Guus Kroonen et al. 2022 argues for a possible association between the Catacomb culture and early Tocharian languages, before spreading eastwards.

== Successors ==
The Srubnaya culture was a successor of the Catacomb culture. It has been suggested that the Abashevo culture was partially derived from the Catacomb culture. Parts of the area of the Catacomb culture came to be occupied by the Abashevo culture, and later by the Srubnaya culture. The Multi-cordoned ware culture was an eastern successor of the Catacomb culture. It in turn may have played a role in the emergence of the Potapovka culture and the Sintashta culture, and thus on the formation of the Andronovo culture. Morphological data suggests that the Sintashta culture might have emerged as a result of a mixture of steppe ancestry from the Poltavka culture and Catacomb culture, with ancestry from Neolithic forest hunter-gatherers. (Note: "Morphological data suggests that both Fedorovka and Alakul' skeletons may be related to Sintashta groups, which in turn may reflect admixture of Neolithic forest HGs and steppe pastoralists, descendants of the Catacomb and Poltavka cultures.")

== See also ==
- Dnieper-Donets culture

== Bibliography ==
- Allentoft, ME (11 June 2015). "Population genomics of Bronze Age Eurasia". Nature. 522 (7555): 167–172. Bibcode:2015Natur.522..167A. doi:10.1038/nature14507. PMID 26062507. S2CID 4399103.
- Anthony, David W. (2007). The horse, the wheel, and language: how Bronze-Age riders from the Eurasian steppes shaped the modern world. Princeton, N.J.: Princeton University Press. ISBN 978-0-691-05887-0.
- Juras, Anna (2 August 2018). "Mitochondrial genomes reveal an east to west cline of steppe ancestry in Corded Ware populations". Scientific Reports. 8 (1). Nature Research: 11603. Bibcode:2018NatSR...811603J. doi:10.1038/s41598-018-29914-5. PMC 6072757. PMID 30072694.
- Kuzmina, Elena E. (2007). Mallory, J. P. (ed.). The Origin of the Indo-Iranians. BRILL. ISBN 978-90-04-16054-5.
- Mallory, J. P.; Adams, Douglas Q. (1997). Encyclopedia of Indo-European Culture. Taylor & Francis. ISBN 1-884964-98-2.
- Narasimhan, Vagheesh M. (6 September 2019). "The formation of human populations in South and Central Asia". Science. 365 (6457) eaat7487. American Association for the Advancement of Science. bioRxiv 10.1101/292581. doi:10.1126/science.aat7487. PMC 6822619. PMID 31488661.
- Nikitin, Alexey G. (2 February 2017). "Subdivisions of haplogroups U and C encompass mitochondrial DNA lineages of Eneolithic–Early Bronze Age Kurgan populations of western North Pontic steppe". Journal of Human Genetics. 62 (6). Nature Research: 605–613. doi:10.1038/jhg.2017.12. PMID 28148921. S2CID 7459815.
- Pashnick, Jeff (August 2014). "Genetic Analysis of Ancient Human Remains from the Early Bronze Age Cultures of the North PonticSteppe Region". Masters These. 737. Nature Research.
- Wang, Chuan-Chao (4 February 2019). "Ancient human genome-wide data from a 3000-year interval in the Caucasus corresponds with eco-geographic regions Eurasia". Nature Communications. 10 (1): 590. Bibcode:2019NatCo..10..590W. bioRxiv 10.1101/322347. doi:10.1038/s41467-018-08220-8. PMC 6360191. PMID 30713341.
