= Multi-cordoned ware culture =

Bronze age steppe culture, 22nd to 18th centuries BCE

- Geographical range: Pontic steppe, Eastern Europe
- Period: Bronze Age
- Dates: ca. 2200–1750 BC
- Preceded by: Catacomb culture
- Followed by: Srubnaya culture, Noua-Sabatinovka-Coslogeni complex

Multi-cordoned Ware culture or Multiroller ceramics culture, or Babyne culture (Ukrainian: Бабине) also known as the Multiple-relief-band ware culture, Babyno/Babino culture or the Mnogovalikovaya kul'tura (MVK, (Russian: Культура многоваликовой керамики, romanized: Kul'tura mnogovalikovoj keramiki (KMK))), are archaeological names for a Middle Bronze Age culture of Eastern Europe.

== Distribution ==
From approximately the 22nd to 18th centuries BCE, it occupied an area stretching from the Don to Moldavia, including Dnipro Ukraine, Right-bank Ukraine, and part of the modern Ternopil Oblast, and was bordered by the Volga to the east.

== Origins ==
KMK succeeded the western Catacomb culture.

== Characteristics ==
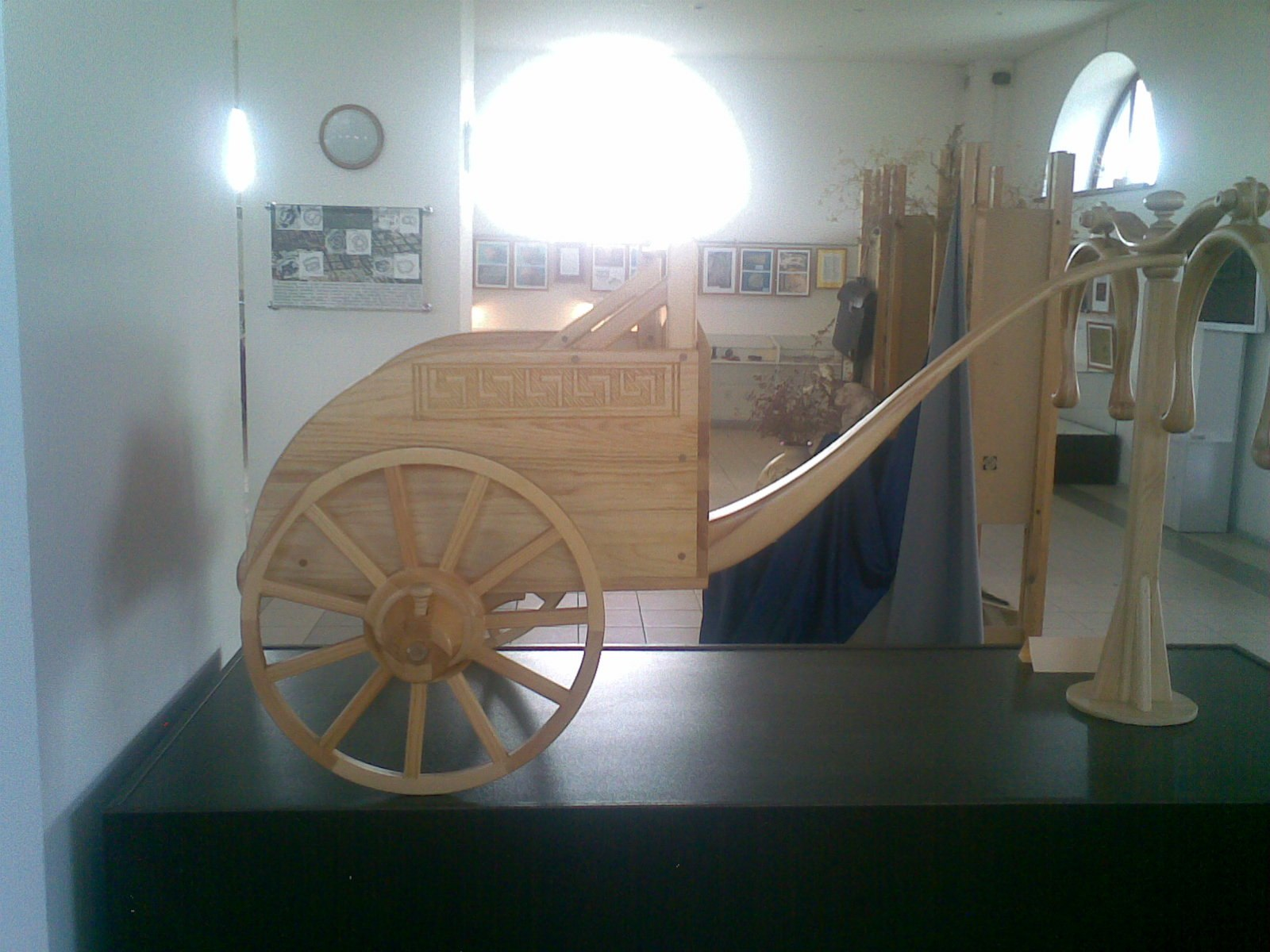
Chariot model, Arkaim museum

In 1929, the archaeologist Ya. Brik studied four kurgans of this culture near Ostapye village, currently in Ternopil Raion, Ukraine. He found ceramics, flint tools, bone and bronze decorations. Bottoms, walls and ceilings of the graves are layered with rocks. Skeletons are laid in a contracted position towards the east.

The name of this culture is related to its ceramic goods, such as pots, which were decorated with multiple strips of clay (cordons) before firing. The culture also featured various other distinctive ornaments

KMK tribes practiced herding and made widespread use of chariots. According to Anthony (2007), chariotry spread from the Multi-cordoned ware culture to the Monteoru, Vatin and Ottomány cultures in southeastern Europe.

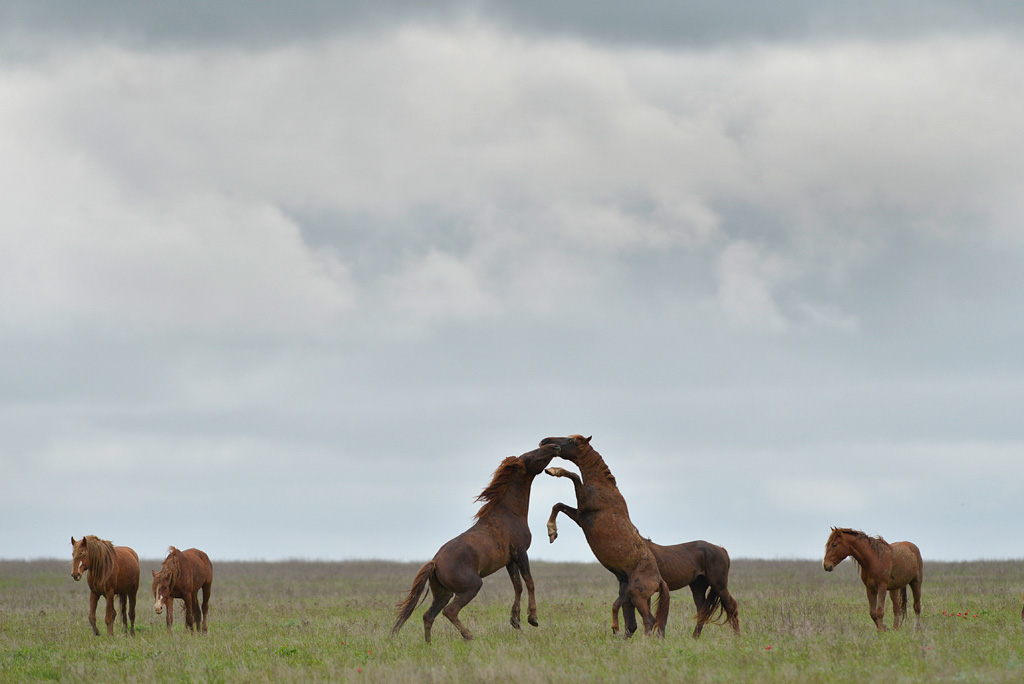
Horses were domesticated on the Pontic-Caspian steppe.

200 or more Multi-cordoned Ware settlements have been documented, some with cultural deposits 1 metre thick (e.g. Babino III). Occasional fortified settlements are known, pointing to higher interregional conflict than in previous periods. Houses included sunken earth-houses and ground-level wooden-post buildings with a rectangular plan.

== Ethnicity ==
Circumstantial evidence links KMK to the spread of one or more Indo-European languages. Leo Klejn identifies its bearers with the early Thracians. Other scholars suggest that KMK may have been connected to the Bryges and/or Phrygians. Sofia Berezanska, who researched numerous sites of the culture, suggested parallels between it and the later Shaft graves of the Middle Helladic period, thus suggesting that the culture was ancestral to Greeks. This latter hypothesis does not rule out the relation to Phrygians, as their language was the closest to Proto-Greek and might have split from the latter shortly before their arrival to the Balkans.

== Successors ==
It was increasingly influenced, assimilated and eventually displaced by the Timber grave or Srubna/Srubnaya culture. In c. 2000 – 1800 BCE bearers of KMK migrated southward into the Balkans.

== Physical type ==
The physical type of the Multi-cordoned Ware culture has been designated as dolichocephalic. (Note: "During the period of the Timber-grave culture the population of the Ukraine was represented by the medium type between the dolichocephalous narrow-faced population of the Multi-roller Ware culture...")

== Genetics ==
=== Paternal haplogroups ===
According to genetic studies, the Multi-cordoned ware culture had haplogroups R1a and R1b

=== Maternal haplogroups ===
Multi-cordoned Ware culture had haplogroups such as J2b1a, J1c2m, H1e, H13a2b2a, H5a1a, R1a1a, V7, U2e2a, H2a2b, U3a, U5a2, R1a, H15a1a1 and HV1

=== Autosomal DNA ===
Whole genome analysis of Babyne individuals from the northwest Pontic showed them carrying the Core Yamna ancestry (77-92%) with admixtures from Globular Amphora (3-15%) and Ukraine Neolithic (5-8%).

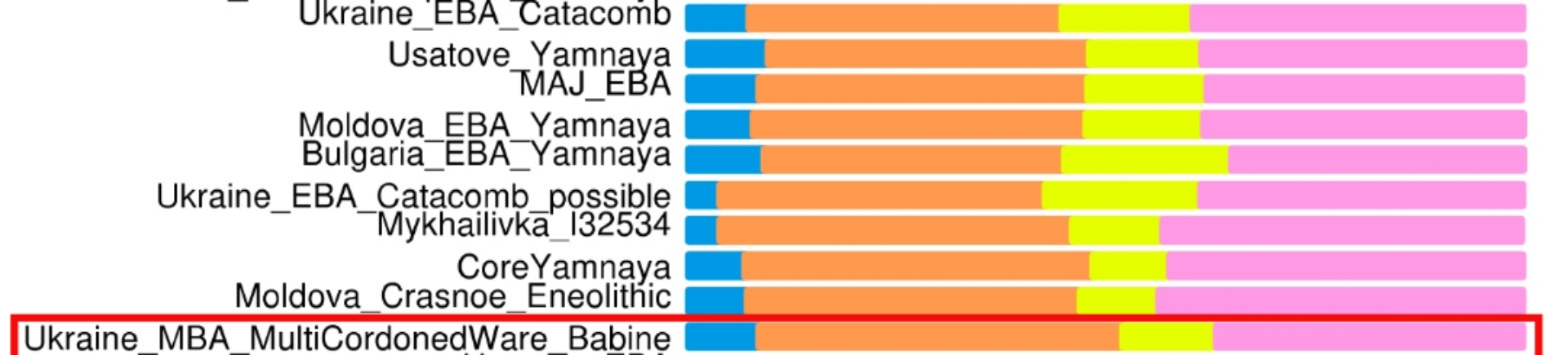
Autosomal dna multi-cordoned ware culture. Eastern Hunter Gatherer ( EHG), Caucasian Hunter-Gatherer ( CHG), Anatolian Neolithic ( ) and Western Hunter Gatherer ( WHG)

== See also ==
- Sintashta culture
- Andronovo culture
- Abashevo culture

== Sources ==
- Kohl, Philip L. (2007). The Making of Bronze Age Eurasia. Cambridge University Press. ISBN 978-1-1394-6199-3.
- Kuzmina, Elena E. (2007). Mallory, J. P. (ed.). The Origin of the Indo-Iranians. BRILL. ISBN 978-90-04-16054-5.

== Literature ==
- Куштан Д.П. Памятники Культуры Многоваликовой Керамики В Среднем Поднепровье (По Материалам Разведок В Зоне Кременчугского Водохранилища)
- Тернопільський енциклопедичний словник. — Тернопіль, видавничо-поліграфічний комбінат «Збруч», том 1, 2004.
- Тернопілля: сторінки історії. — X, 1995;
- Словник-довідник з археології. — К., 1996.
