= Archaeology of Russia =

Russian archaeology begins in the Russian Empire in the 1850s and becomes Soviet archaeology in the early 20th century. The journal Sovetskaya arkheologiya is published from 1957.

== Archaeologists ==
Name	Born	Died	Specialization	Achievements
Aleksey Uvarov	1825	1884		
Dmitry Samokvasov	1843	1911		
Dmitry Nikolayevich Anuchin	1843	1923		
Nikodim Kondakov	1844	1925		
Fyodor Uspensky	1845	1928		
Nikolay Veselovsky	1848	1918		
Alexandr Spitsyn	1858	1931		
Vasilij Gorodtsov	1860	1945		
Boris Farmakovsky	1870	1928		
Michael Rostovtzeff	1870	1952		
Sergei Rudenko	1885	1969		
Mikhail Artamonov	1898	1972		
Boris Grakov	1899	1970		
Artemiy Artsikhovsky	1902	1978		
Mikhail Gerasimov	1907	1970		
Alexey Okladnikov	1908	1981		
Boris Piotrovsky	1908	1990		
Boris Rybakov	1908	2001		
Leo Klejn	1927			
Vladimir Masson	1929	2010		
Viktor Sarianidi	1929			
Valentin Yanin	1929			
Anatoly Kirpichnikov	1929			
Yelena Kuzmina	1931			
Boris Marshak	1933	2006		
Evgeny Chernykh	1935			
Mark Shchukin	1937	2008		
Pavel Dolukhanov	1937	2009		
Dmitry Machinsky	1937	2012		
Gleb Lebedev	1943	2003		
Natalia Polosmak	1956			

== Sites ==
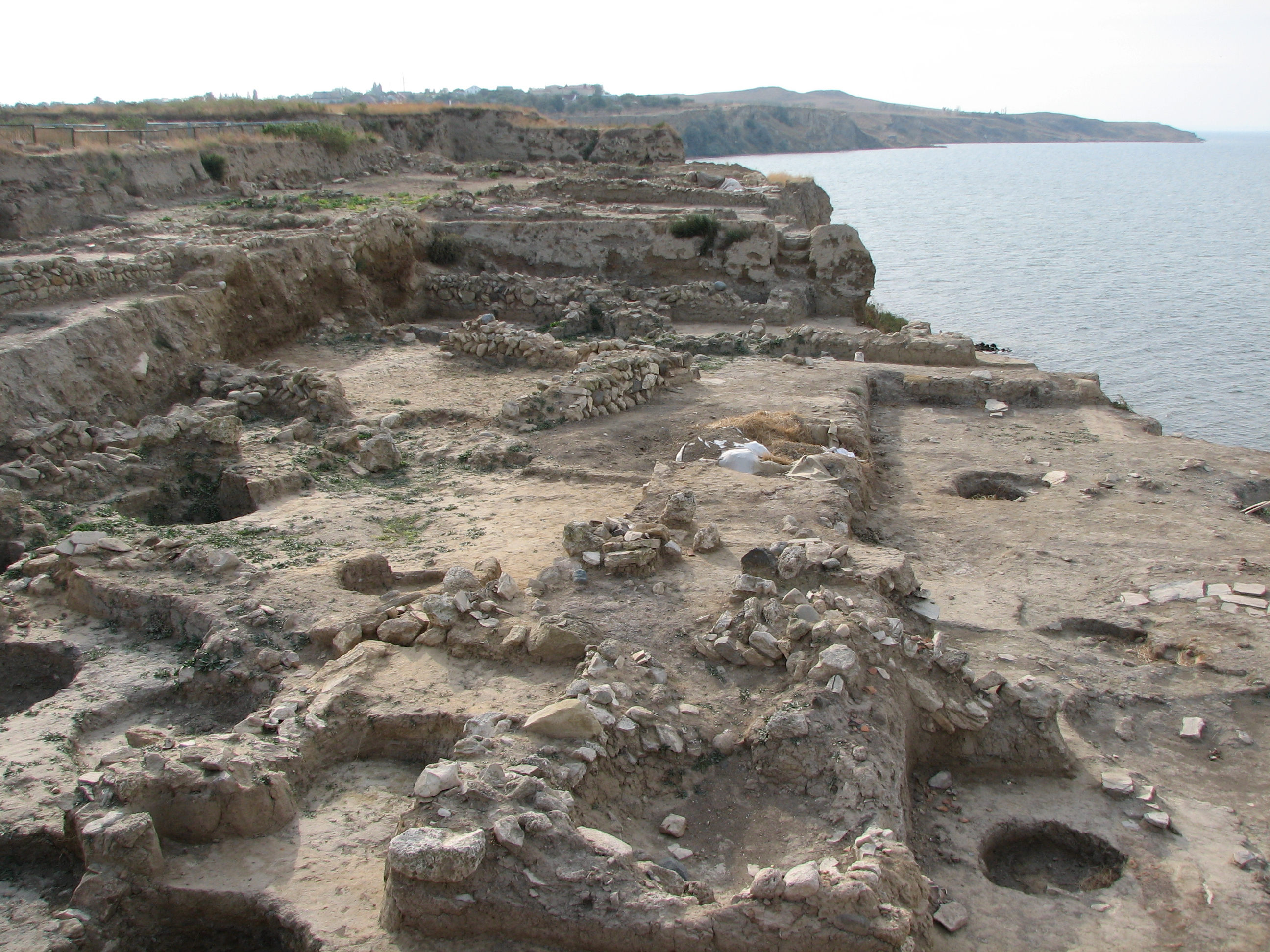
Excavation of Hermonassa (Tmutarakan), September 2008

major archaeological cultures and sites in Russia

  - Kermek (ru:Кермек (стоянка))
  - Bogatyri/Sinyaya Balka (ru:Богатыри/Синяя балка)
  - Palaeolithic site Kostyonki
  - Sungir
  - Yana RHS (ru:Янская стоянка)
  - Afontova Gora
- Mal'ta–Buret' culture (Upper Paleolithic)
- Khvalynsk culture (Eneolithic)
- Fatyanovo–Balanovo culture (Chalcolithic)
- Novotitorovka culture (Early Bronze Age)
- Maykop culture (Early Bronze Age)
  - Maykop kurgan
- Yamna culture
- Afanasevo culture (Early Bronze Age)
- Abashevo culture (Bronze Age)
- Andronovo culture (Middle to Late Bronze Age)
  - Arkaim
  - Sintashta
- Srubna culture (Late Bronze to Iron Age)
- Tanais (Late Bronze to Iron Age)
- Pazyryk culture (Iron Age)
- Tmutarakan
- Staraya Ladoga (Viking Age)
- Rurikovo Gorodische
- Gnyozdovo
- Sarkel (9th century)

== See also ==
- History of archaeology
- History of Russia
- History of Central Asia
- Scythia
- Kurgan hypothesis
- List of Russian historians

== Literature ==
- B. Trigger, A History of Archaeological Thought, McGill University, Montréal, pp. 327ff.
- Mikhail Miller, Archaeology in the U.S.S.R, New York (1956).
