= Alexei Rezepkin =

Russian archaeologist (born 1949)

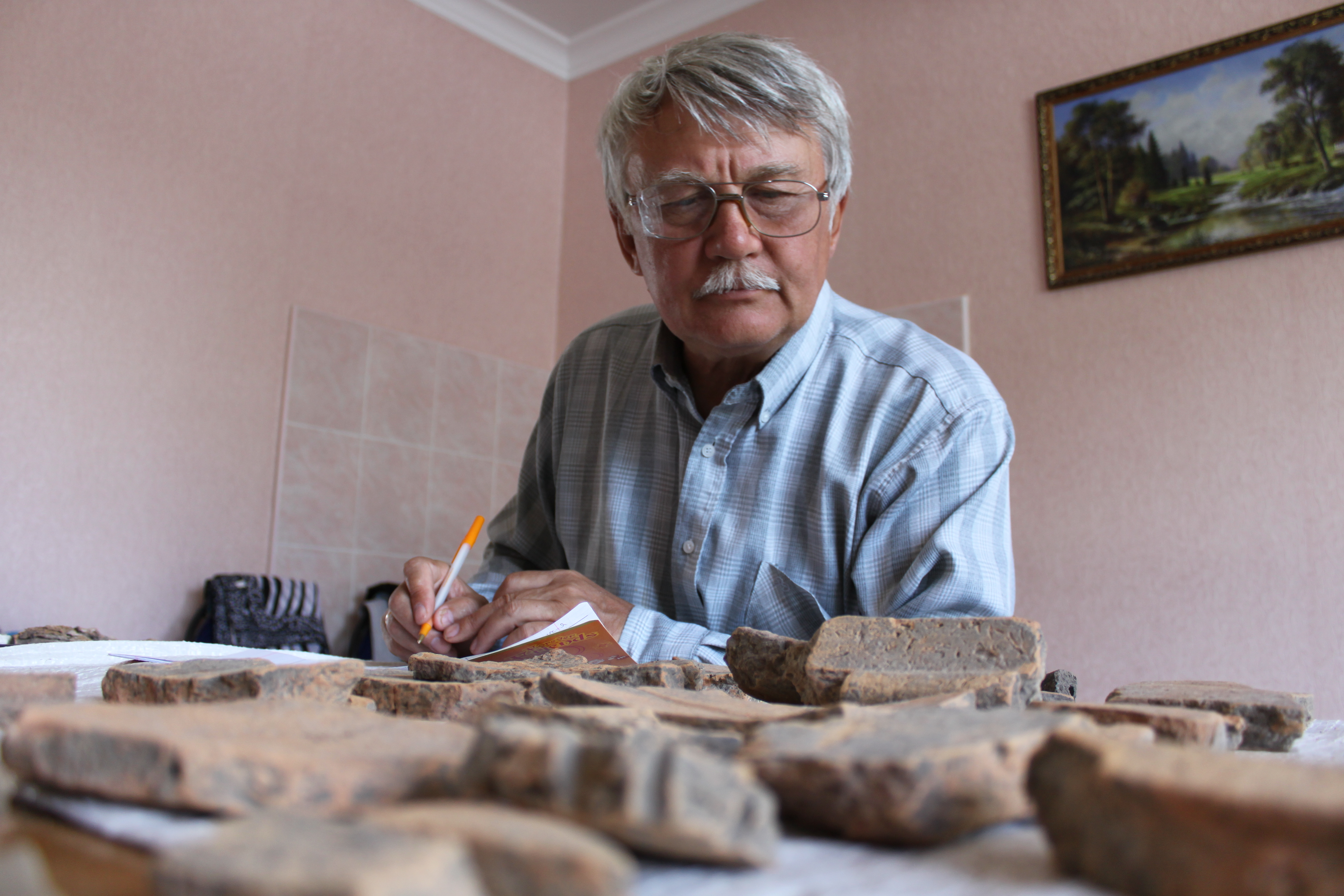
Alexei Rezepkin at work in 2013

Alexei Rezepkin (Russian: Алексей Дмитриевич Резепкин; born 25 March 1949) is a Russian archaeologist who made some significant archeological discoveries. He is a senior researcher at the Institute of History of Material Culture in St. Petersburg where he lives.

== Biography ==
He was born in Yershovka, Chelyabinsk oblast, and attended school in Sibay, Bashkortostan. He comes from the family of Orenburg Cossacks that in the past suffered repression from Soviet authorities. He graduated from the Department of Archaeology of the University of Leningrad, and started work at the Institute of History of Material Culture in 1976. He is married to G. N. Poplevko.

== Excavations and research ==
Starting in 1979, he was leading excavations in the territory of the North Caucasus and Transcaucasia (Adygea, Krasnodar Region, Karachay-Cherkessia, Abkhazia). Over 30 years he has thoroughly excavated the Klady kurgan burial complex near Novosvobodnaya in Adygea. Rezepkin contributed significantly to the study of settlements and burials of the early Bronze Age in the North Caucasus.

In 1989 Rezepkin defended his Ph.D. thesis "Northwest Caucasus in the Early Bronze Age (based on burial sites of Novosvobodnaya type)". He also confirmed the existence of megaliths in the southern Urals.

He also contributed to the study and discussion of the origin of the Proto-Indo-Europeans.

Rezepkin sees Novosvobodnaya culture as independent from Maikop culture.

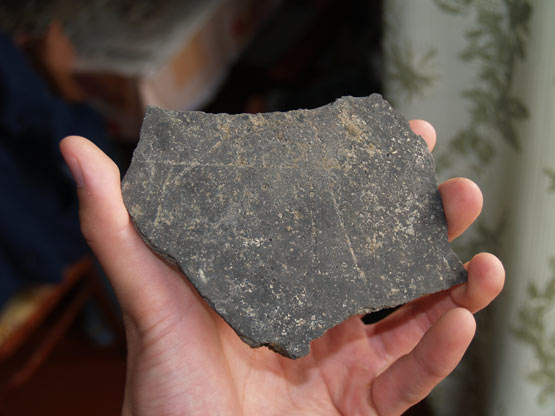
Ornament on black ceramics of Novosvobodnaya culture. Klady (Hashpek). 2006.

For the first time, Rezepkin linked the finds from Novosvobodnaya with the artifacts of the Funnelbeaker culture from the ancient Germany and Denmark, rather than with the Globular Amphora culture, as was thought previously.

He sees the Funnelbeakers as prior to the Globular Amphora culture, and dates Novosvobodnaya culture to 3600-3000 BC.

According to Rezepkin, the difference between Novosvobodnaya and Maykop is that Novosvobodnaya, in the early stages of its development, had clearly Western roots, and Maykop Near Eastern ones. According to Rezepkin, in Novosvobodnaya culture we see the real meeting of East and West.

However, some other archaeologists insist on a wider Maykop-Novosvobodnaya cultural unity, while both cultures did feature various local variants.

== Genetic research ==
Together with the geneticist A.V. Nedoluzhko, he conducted Russia's first complete sequencing of the DNA of ancient mitochondrial genome. This DNA sample was isolated from the mitochondria of skeletal remains from the burial ground Klady.

MtDNA haplogroup V has been reported in Neolithic remains of the Linear Pottery culture at Halberstadt, Germany c. 5000 BC and Derenburg Meerenstieg, Germany c. 4910 BC. Haplogroup V7 was found in representative of Novosvobodnaya culture.

However, these are clearly due to the Neolithic expansion and nothing else.

== The origin of the Indo-Europeans ==
According to Rezepkin, Central Europe must have been the homeland of the Indo-Europeans (Proto-Indo-European homeland). Accordingly, Indo-Europeans were behind the successive Linear Pottery culture, the Funnelbeaker culture, the Globular Amphora culture, and the Corded Ware culture. In favor of this view is the apparent lack of any abrupt change in European populations since the Neolithic, and until the first written sources appear.

Rezepkin sees the emergence of Novosvobodnaya culture as the result of a migration from Europe. Their 'Megalitism', their black-polished ceramic amphorae, bowls and cups, find a compelling analogy in the Funnelbeaker culture of Germany.

== Recent discoveries ==
Several important discoveries were made by Rezepkin in the course of his excavations. Among them what seems as the oldest sword in the world.

=== The oldest sword ===
This ancient bronze sword dates to around 3400 BC. It was found in a stone tomb near Novosvobodnaya, and is now on display in the Hermitage in St. Petersburg. It was discovered in Kurgan 31, tomb 5 at the burial site Klady, which is attributed to the Maikop culture. This burial belongs to local Phase 3 at Klady, corresponding to the last Phase 4 of the Maikop culture. It has a total length of 63 cm and a hilt length of 11 cm. The radiocarbon dates for Phase 3 at Klady are 3500-3342 (68% probability), and 3500-3128 (95% probability).

Previously, the oldest swords were reported from Arslantepe, and they are dated soon after the Klady sword, or about a century later.

== Other discoveries ==
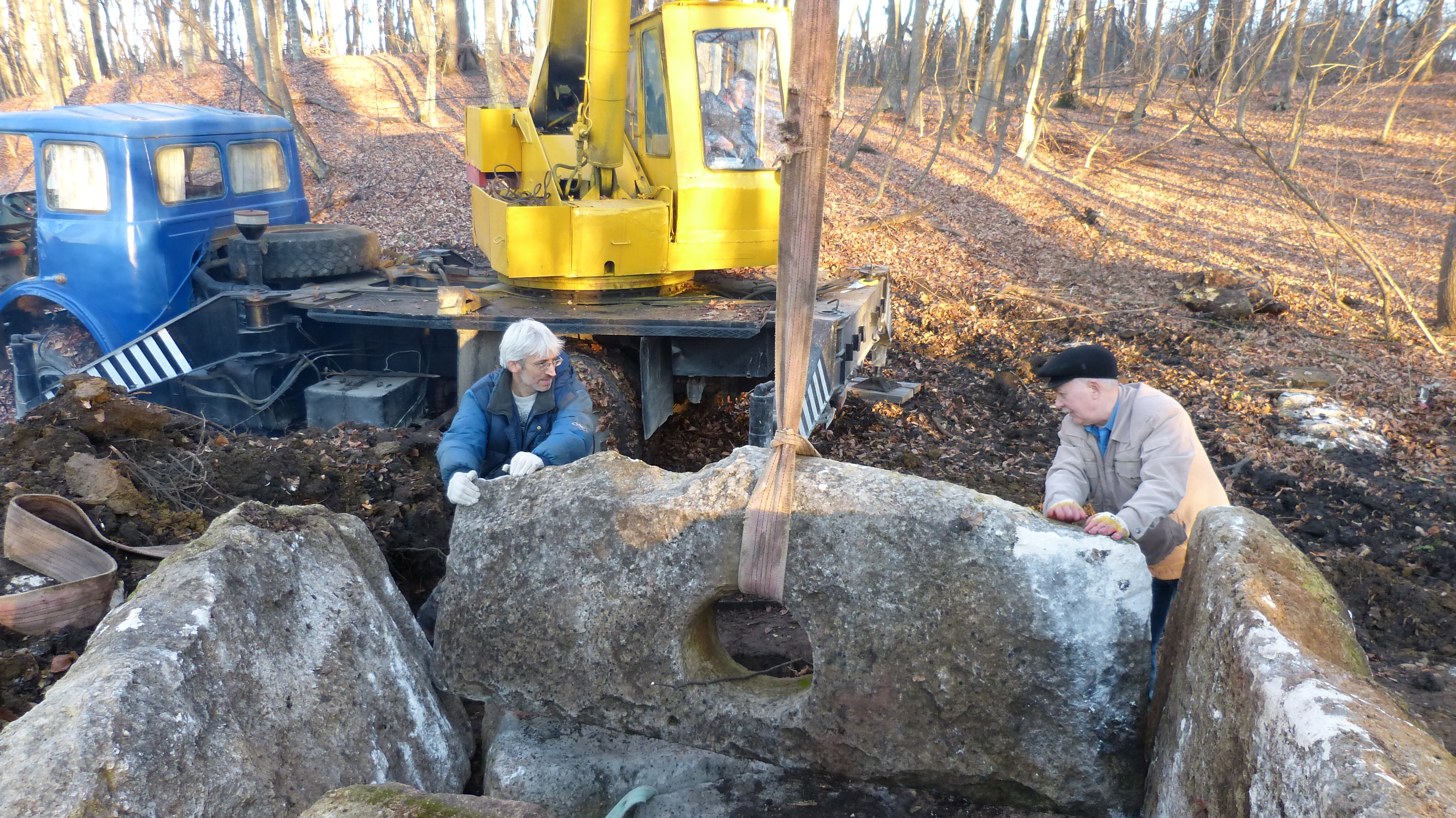
Reconstruction of dolmen in Pobeda in 2016 (Alexei Rezepkin right side)

Recent discoveries by A. Rezepkin also include:

- The most ancient architectural column.

Previously, the oldest musical instruments (the Lyres of Ur) were reported by Leonard Woolley from the excavations of Ur.

- The most ancient (dating approx. the mid-4th millennium B.C.) polychrome wall painting in the tombs.

== See also ==
- Novotitorovka culture
- Leyla-Tepe culture

== Bibliography ==
- Mariya Ivanova (2013). The Black Sea and the Early Civilizations of Europe, the Near East and Asia. Cambridge University Press. ISBN 978-1-107-24504-4.
- 'Rezepkin A. D. (1992). "Paintings from a tomb of the Majkop culture". Journal of Indo-European Studies. 20: 59–70.
- M. Leidorf (2000). Das frühbronzezeitliche Gräberfeld von Klady und die Majkop-Kultur in Nordwestkaukasien. Archäologie in Eurasien. Vol. 10. ISBN 978-3-89646-259-6.
- Алексей Резепкин, К интерпретации росписи из гробницы майкопской культуры близ станицы Новосвободная // КСИА АН СССР — Вып.192. — М.: Наука, 1987. — С. 26—33.
- Алексей Резепкин, Музыкальный инструмент эпохи ранней бронзы. — М., 1990.
- Алексей Резепкин, Курган 31 могильника Клады. Проблемы генезиса и хронологии майкопской культуры // Древние культуры Прикубанья (по материалам работ в зонах мелиорации Краснодарского края). — Л.: Наука, 1991. — С. 167—197.
- Алексей Резепкин, Поселение Новосвободненское // Археология Кавказа и Ближнего Востока: сб. к 80-летию члена-корреспондента РАН, профессора Р. М. Мунчаева. — М.: ТАУС, 2008. — С. 156—176. — ISBN 978-5-903011-37-7
- Алексей Резепкин, Новосвободненская культура (на основе материалам могильника Клады) // Труды ИИМК РАН. — СПб.: Нестор-История, 2012. — Т. ХXXVII. – 344 с.
