= Nikolay Veselovsky =

Russian archaeologist and orientalist (1848–1918)

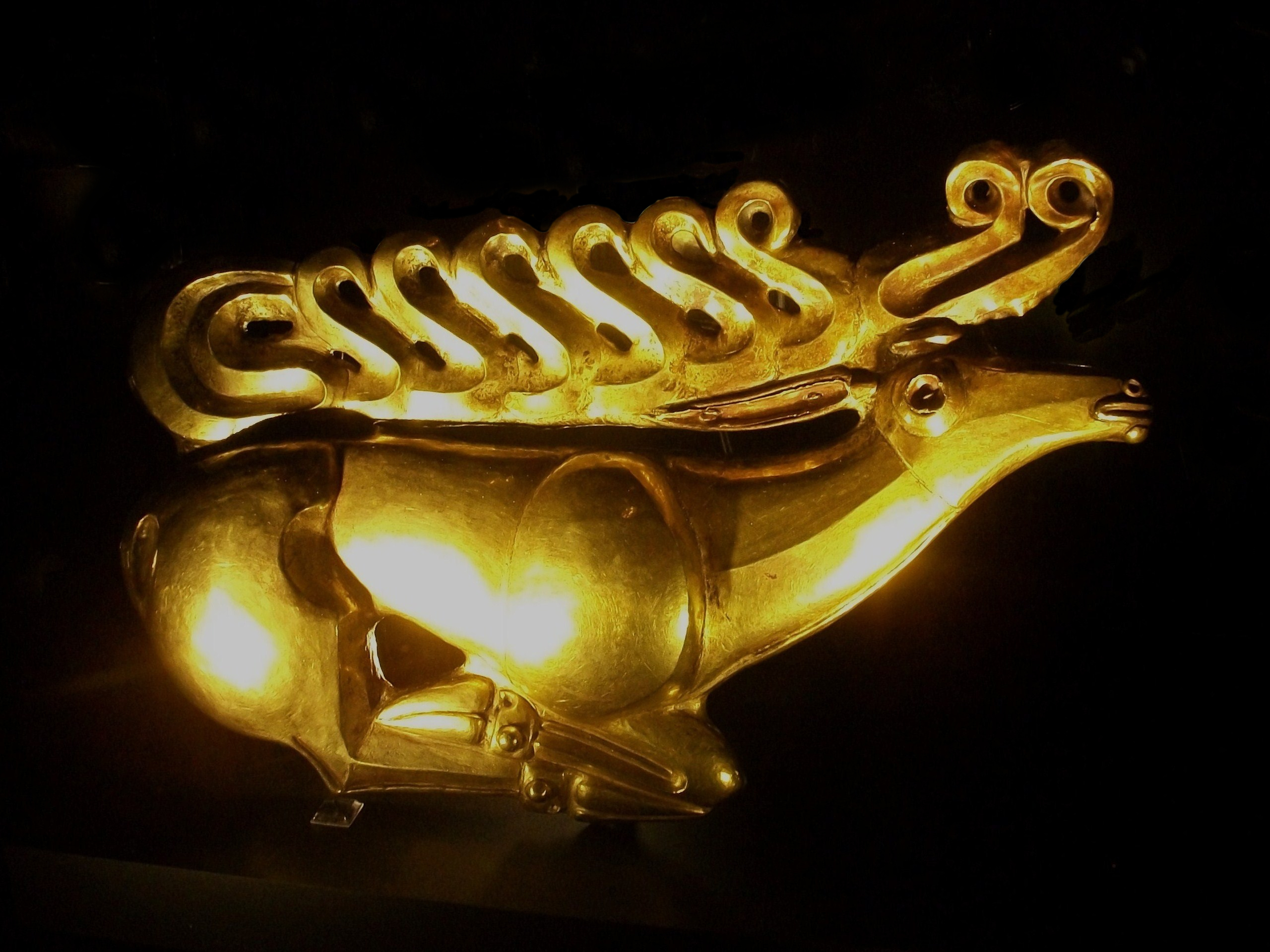
Gold stag shield plaque from Kostromskaya, 12.5 in/31.7 cm long, end 7th century BC, found by Veselovsky in 1897

Nikolai Ivanovich Veselovsky (Russian: Николай Иванович Веселовский; November 1848 – 30 March 1918) was a Russian archaeologist and orientalist who, in the space of 23 years, excavated about 500 kurgans in the Kuban Region.

Born in Moscow, Veselovsky went to school in Vologda. He studied and then read lectures at the St Petersburg Imperial University (reader in 1877, extraordinarius in 1884, ordinarius from 1890).

As a young man, Veselovsky was the first to excavate Afrasiab, the oldest part of Samarkand. In Samarkand he met and became friends with the local historian, collector and merchant Mirza Bukhari, and acquired over 1,000 valuable artifacts from him. He then turned his attention to Tamerlane's mausoleum and some other gems of Timurid architecture to stave off a threat of collapse after a series of earthquakes.

Veselovsky is best known today for a series of notable kurgans that he explored in Southern Russia: Maikop kurgan (which lends its name to the Maikop culture), Kostromskaya (1897), Ulyap kurgans (1898), Kelermes kurgans (1903), Semikolenny kurgan, and (in what turned out to be his final field work) the Yelizavetinskaya kurgans. In 1912, Veselovsky moved to New Russia (present-day Ukraine) to explore the Solokha grave of a Scythian king.

Many of his digs were emergency excavations at sites threatened or partly destroyed by looting. In a single season, he had to oversee numerous digs at distant locations. As a result, some excavations were hastily conducted by underqualified assistants, prompting later Soviet archaeologists to explore these sites again. Nevertheless, it was Veselovsky (and his team) that discovered some of the finest examples of Scythian art, including the Solokha comb.

Veselovsky also unearthed notable examples of medieval art, particularly the jewellery and textiles from the Golden Horde during his exploration of the Belorechensky kurgans in 1906 and 1907.
