= Darkveti-Meshoko =

Chalcolithic culture

Pricked Pearls Pottery culture
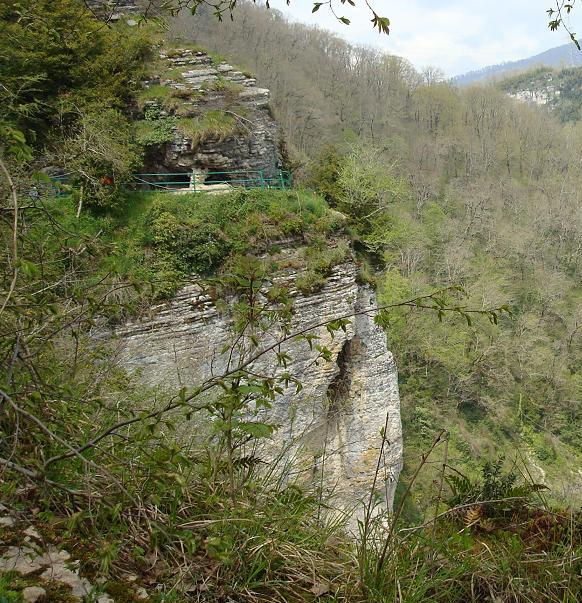
- Geographical range: North Caucasus
- Period: Eneolithic
- Dates: c. 4500 – 3000 BC
- Preceded by: Mariupol culture, Sredny Stog culture
- Followed by: Maykop culture, Novosvobodnaya culture

The Darkveti-Meshoko culture, also known as the Pricked Pearls Pottery culture, is a Chalcolithic culture spread in the Western Caucasus, named after major sites of Darkveti (Imereti region) and Meshoko (Adygea). First sites of this culture were discovered in 1958 by Russian anthropologists, but were at first considered to be sites of Maykop culture. In 1980s the site of Svobodnoe was discovered, which bore a close resemblance to the site of Meshoko. An argument among anthropologists culminated in attributing the Svobodnoe and Meshoko sites to a culture separate from Maykop, the attribution of the Darkveti site to the Svobodnoe-Meshoko culture happened separately. The monolithic nature of Darkveti-Meshoko has been proven by genetic research. Clear similarities between items found in the sites of Darkveti and those found in the sites in Adygea and neighboring regions had been noted. This was later confirmed by L. Nebieridze, who was the first to propose including Darkveti site and North-West Caucasian sites within one culture.

The dating of Darkveti-Meshoko is somewhat disputed, but the recent trend is to date it earlier. Antonio Sagona (2018) talks about "the Pre-Maikop Horizon (ca. 4500–3800 BC)" that may presumably include Meshoko. Earlier, Bertille Lyonnet (2007) mentioned dates for Meshoko between 4060 and 3960 cal. BC.
