= Claire Miller =

Scottish environmental statistician

Claire Miller (née Claire Ann Ferguson) is a Scottish environmental statistician, a professor of statistics in the School of Mathematics and Statistics at the University of Glasgow, and a former president of the International Environmetrics Society. Her research focuses on statistical models of water quality.

== Education and career ==
Miller was a student at the University of Glasgow, where she received first class honours in mathematics and statistics in 2003, and continued for a Ph.D. in 2007. Her dissertation, Univariate and multivariate statistical methodologies for lake ecosystem modelling, was jointly supervised by Adrian Bowman and Marian Scott.

She has been a member of the academic staff at the University of Glasgow since 2007.

== Recognition ==
Miller became an Elected Member of the International Statistical Institute in 2015, and belonged to the Young Academy of Scotland of the Royal Society of Edinburgh from 2016 to 2021. She served as president of the International Environmetrics Society from 2023 to 2025.

She was the 2018 recipient of the Abdel El-Shaarawi Early Investigator's Award of the International Environmetrics Society, "for outstanding contributions to environmental statistical and quantitative research with a special focus on water quality, including functional data, time series clustering and dimension reduction for spatiotemporal flow-connected network data". In 2025 she received the Barnett Award of the Royal Statistical Society for "exceptional contributions to environmental statistics" and "pioneering work in water quality measuring, monitoring and forecasting".

In 2026, Miller was elected a Fellow of the Royal Society of Edinburgh, in the discipline of informatics, mathematics and statistics.
