= Novosvobodnaya culture =

Early Bronze Age archaeological culture in the North Caucasus

- Geographical range: North Caucasus in Europe
- Period: Copper Age, Bronze Age
- Dates: c. 3500 – 3100 BCE
- Preceded by: Maykop culture
- Followed by: Yamnaya culture

Novosvobodnaya culture (Russian: Новосвободненская культура Novosvobodnenskaya kultura, also Novosvobodna, Novosvobodnaja) is an archaeological culture of the Early Bronze Age in the foothills of the North Caucasus (3500-3100 BC). It is named after the megalithic tombs excavated in 1898 by Nikolai Veselovsky near the stanitsa Tsarskoy, now Novosvobodnaya in Adygea.

== History of research ==
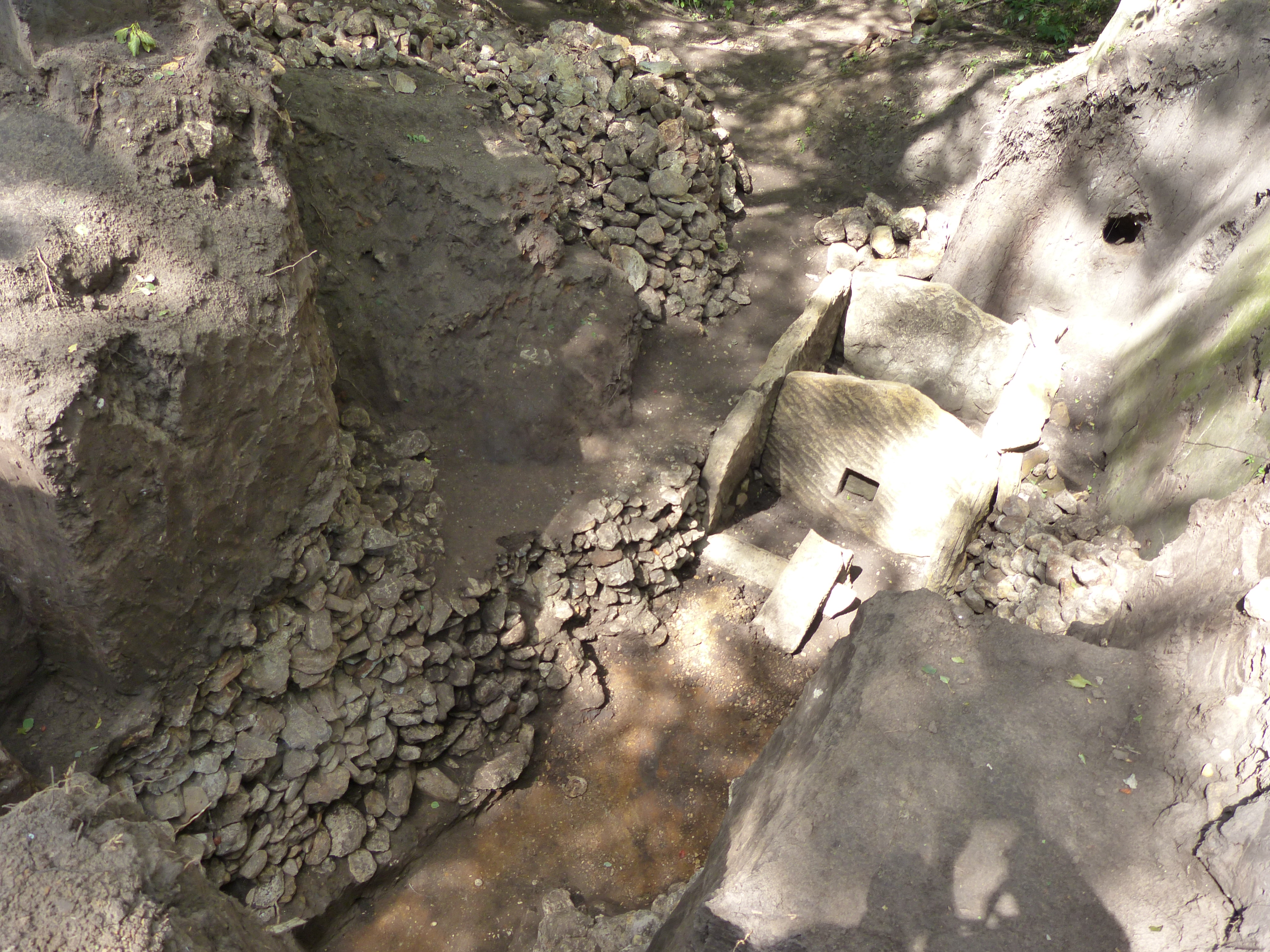
Excavations at the Klady kurgan near the Novosvobodnaya settlement

For a long time, the graves of Novosvobodnaya were considered to belong to a late stage of Maykop culture. The British-Australian archaeologist Gordon Childe (1952) pointed out the connection between the pottery of Novosvobodnaya and the pottery of the Globular Amphora culture of Central Europe.

The archaeologists N. A. Nikolaev and Vladimir Safronov were the first to distinguish the Novosvobodnaya sites from the Maykop culture and define Novosvobodnaya as a separate archaeological culture associated with the group of Funnelbeaker culture, Corded Ware culture and Globular Amphora cultures of Central Europe. Aleksey Rezepkin, who led the excavations at the Novosvobodnaya settlement, also noted the similarity of Novosvobodnaya's pottery with the ceramics of the Northern European Funnelbeaker culture. But unlike Childe, Rezepkin dated them to the end of the 6th millennium BC. According to Rezepkin, Novosvobodnaya's main distinguishing features as an independent culture were the megalithic tombs, black polished pottery, and bronze objects (axes, daggers, spears), which differ from the more archaic objects of the Maykop culture. The pearl-like decoration on axes, as well as on bronze and earthenware vessels, is absent from the Maykop culture.

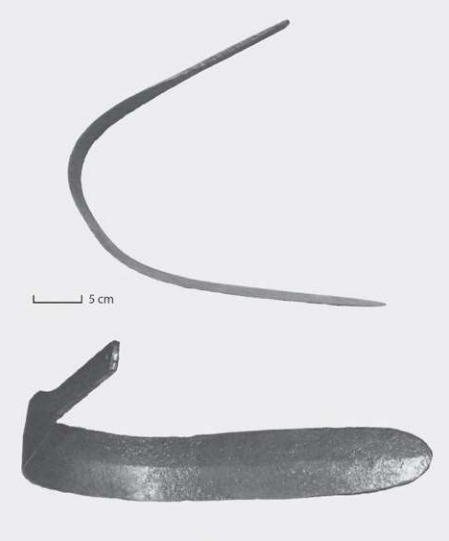
Sword from Novosvobodnaya Klady

These hypotheses were accepted and expanded by other scholars such as Aleksandr Gej, who distinguished a "steppe-Novosvobodnaya culture".

According to Rezepkin, the difference between the Novosvobodnaya and Maykop cultures was that the Novosvobodnaya shows unmistakable Western European connections at an early stage, while the Maykop culture was mostly related to the cultures of the Near East.

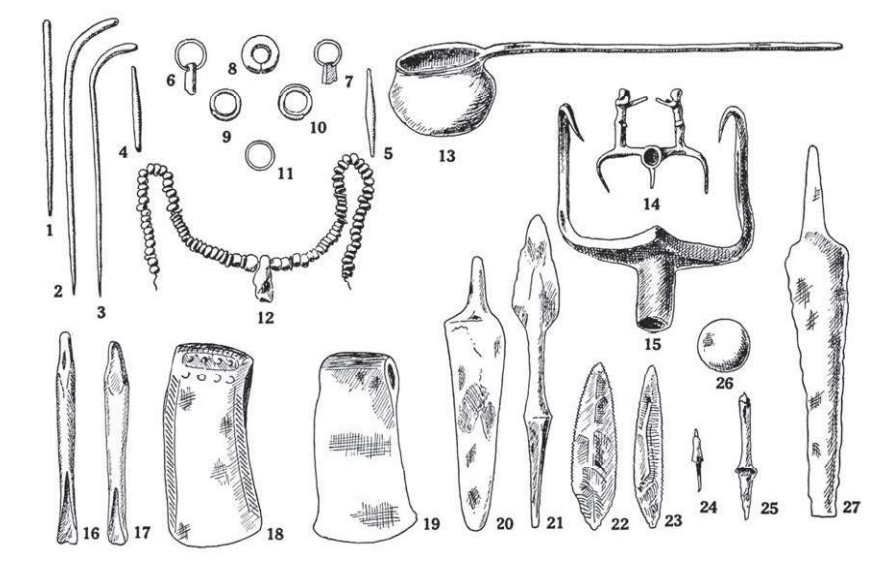
Finds from Kurgan I in Novosvobodnaya

"In Rezepkin’s view, the older Maikop Culture stood under the influence of Mesopotamia, whereas he postulates influences on the younger Novosvobodnaja Culture from the milieu of the Funnel Beaker Culture."

Some archaeologists, including Sergei Korenevsky, prefer the hypothesis of the existence of a more general Maykop-Novosvobodnaya cultural community, that included many local variants such as found at the Galyugayevskaya settlement (Kursky District, Stavropol Krai, Russia).

More recently, excavations at Novosvobodnaya have been continued by Viktor Trifonov of the Institute for the History of Material Culture of the Russian Academy of Sciences, and Natalya Shishlina of the State Historical Museum in Moscow.

== Paleogenetics ==
A complete DNA sequencing was performed on the mitochondrial genome of a representative of the Novosvobodnaya culture from the Klady cemetery, ca. 3,500 BC. The mitochondrial haplogroup V7 was found Haplogroup V (mtDNA), indicating a possible connection between the Novosvobodnaya culture and the Funnel Beaker culture. Another possible burial of the Novosvobodnaya culture, however without grave goods, possessed the mitochondrial haplogroup T2b.

== See also ==
- Yamnaya culture

== Bibliography ==
- Wang, Chuan-Chao; Reinhold, Sabine; Kalmykov, Alexey; Wissgott, Antje; Brandt, Guido; Jeong, Choongwon; Cheronet, Olivia; Ferry, Matthew; Harney, Eadaoin; Keating, Denise; Mallick, Swapan; Rohland, Nadin; Stewardson, Kristin; Kantorovich, Anatoly R.; Maslov, Vladimir E.; Petrenko, Vladimira G.; Erlikh, Vladimir R.; Atabiev, Biaslan Ch.; Magomedov, Rabadan G.; Kohl, Philipp L.; Alt, Kurt W.; Pichler, Sandra L.; Gerling, Claudia; Meller, Harald; Vardanyan, Benik; Yeganyan, Larisa; Rezepkin, Alexey D.; Mariaschk, Dirk; Berezina, Natalia; Gresky, Julia; Fuchs, Katharina; Knipper, Corina; Schiffels, Stephan; Balanovska, Elena; Balanovsky, Oleg; Mathieson, Iain; Higham, Thomas; Berezin, Yakov B.; Buzhilova, Alexandra; Trifonov, Viktor; Pinhasi, Ron; Belinskij, Andrej B.; Reich, David; Hansen, Svend; Krause, Johannes; Haak, Wolfgang (2019). "Ancient human genome-wide data from a 3000-year interval in the Caucasus corresponds with eco-geographic regions". Nature Communications. 10 (1): 590. Bibcode:2019NatCo..10..590W. doi:10.1038/s41467-018-08220-8. PMC 6360191. PMID 30713341.
- Ivanova, Mariya (2007). "The Chronology of the 'Maikop Culture' in the North Caucasus: Changing Perspectives" (PDF). Armenian Journal of Near Eastern Studies. 2: 7–39.
- Mallory, J.P.; Adams, D.Q. (1997). "Maykop Culture". Encyclopedia of Indo-European culture. Fitzroy Dearborn. ISBN 1-884964-98-2. OCLC 1393051571.
- Hansen, Svend (2014). "Gold and silver in the Maikop culture". Tagungen des Landesmuseums für Vorgeschichte Halle. 11 (2): 389–410. ISBN 978-3-944507-13-2.
- Rezepkin, Aleksej D. (2020). "Majkop–Novosvobodnaja: Varianten oder Kulturen? / Майкоп–Новосвободная: общность или культуры?" [Majkop–Novosvobodnaja: variants or cultures?]. In: Kašuba, Maya T.; Reinhold, Sabine; Piotrovskij, Jurij Ju. (eds). Der Kaukasus zwischen Osteuropa und Vorderem Orient in der Bronze- und Eisenzeit: Dialog der Kulturen, Kultur des Dialoges. Кавказ между Восточной Европой и Передним Востоком в бронзовом и железном веке: диалог культур, культура диалога. Berlin: Reimer, ISBN 978-3-496-01642-7, pp. 215–225 (in German and Russian).
