= Marian Scott (statistician) =

Scottish statistician (born 1956)

Marian Scott OBE FRSE
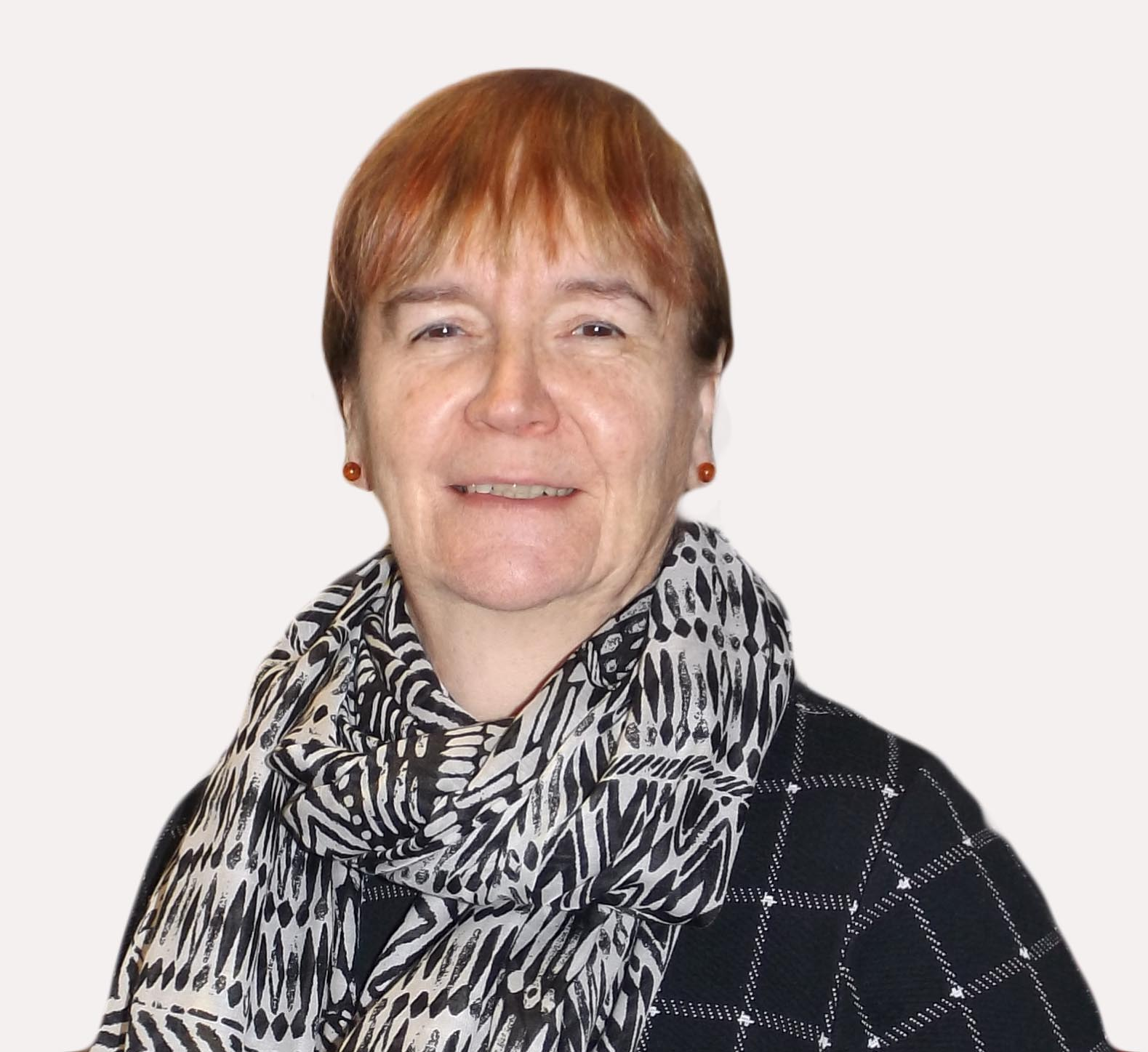
- Born: Ethel Marian Scott; 1956 (age 69–70); Scotland
- Education: University of Glasgow
- Known for: environmental statistics
- Awards: FRSE (2005); OBE (2009); Barnett Award (2019)
- Scientific career
- Fields: environmental statistics
- Doctoral advisor: Murdoch Baxter and Tom Aitchison
- Doctoral students: Claire Miller

Ethel Marian Scott (born July 1956) is a Scottish statistician, author and academic, specialising in environmental statistics and statistical modelling. She is Professor of Environmental Statistics at the University of Glasgow. She is additionally vice-president (International) of the Royal Society of Edinburgh, and a member of the Scottish Science Advisory Council.

== Biography ==
Scott has a degree in statistics and a PhD from the University of Glasgow. Her thesis was on the sources of error in radiocarbon dating, and was supervised by Murdoch Baxter and Tom Aitchison.

Her research interests include model uncertainty and sensitivity analysis, modelling how pollutants disperse in the environment, radiocarbon dating and assessing animal welfare.

In 2005, Scott was elected a Fellow of the Royal Society of Edinburgh (FRSE), Scotland's national academy of science and letters. In the 2009 Queen's Birthday Honours, she was appointed an Officer of the Order of the British Empire (OBE) for services to social science.

Professor Scott was awarded the Royal Statistical Society Barnett Award in 2019 for "her outstanding, pioneering research into the application of innovative statistical techniques to environmental issues."

== Selected works ==
- Scott, E. Marian, ed. (2003). Modelling radioactivity in the environment. Amsterdam: Elsevier. ISBN 9780080436630.
- Scott, E. Marian, ed. (2004). Impact of the environment on human migration in Eurasia: proceedings of the NATO Advanced Research Workshop on Impact of the Environment on Human Migration in Eurasia, St. Petersburg, Russia, 15–18 November 2003. Dordrecht: Kluwer Academic Publishing. ISBN 9781402026546.
- Bowman, Adrian W.; Giannitrapani, Marco; Marian Scott, E. (December 2009). "Spatiotemporal smoothing and sulphur dioxide trends over Europe". Journal of the Royal Statistical Society. Series C (Applied Statistics). 58 (5): 737–752. doi:10.1111/j.1467-9876.2009.00671.x.
- Ventrucci, M.; Scott, E. M.; Cocchi, D. (24 June 2010). "Multiple testing on standardized mortality ratios: a Bayesian hierarchical model for FDR estimation". Biostatistics. 12 (1): 51–67. doi:10.1093/biostatistics/kxq040. PMID 20577014.
- Lee, Duncan; Ferguson, Claire; Scott, E. Marian (January 2011). "Constructing representative air quality indicators with measures of uncertainty". Journal of the Royal Statistical Society. Series A (Statistics in Society). 174 (1): 109–126. doi:10.1111/j.1467-985X.2010.00658.x. S2CID 120171047.
- Finazzi, Francesco; Scott, E. Marian; Fassò, Alessandro (March 2013). "A model-based framework for air quality indices and population risk evaluation, with an application to the analysis of Scottish air quality data". Journal of the Royal Statistical Society. Series C (Applied Statistics). 62 (2): 287–308. doi:10.1111/rssc.12001. PMC 3600869. PMID 23518479.
- Scott, E. Marian (2018). "The role of Statistics in the era of big data: crucial, critical and under-valued" (PDF). Statistics and Probability Letters. 136: 20–24. doi:10.1016/j.spl.2018.02.050. PDF
