= Pavel Dolukhanov =

Russian geographical science professor

Pavel (Paul) Markovich Dolukhanov
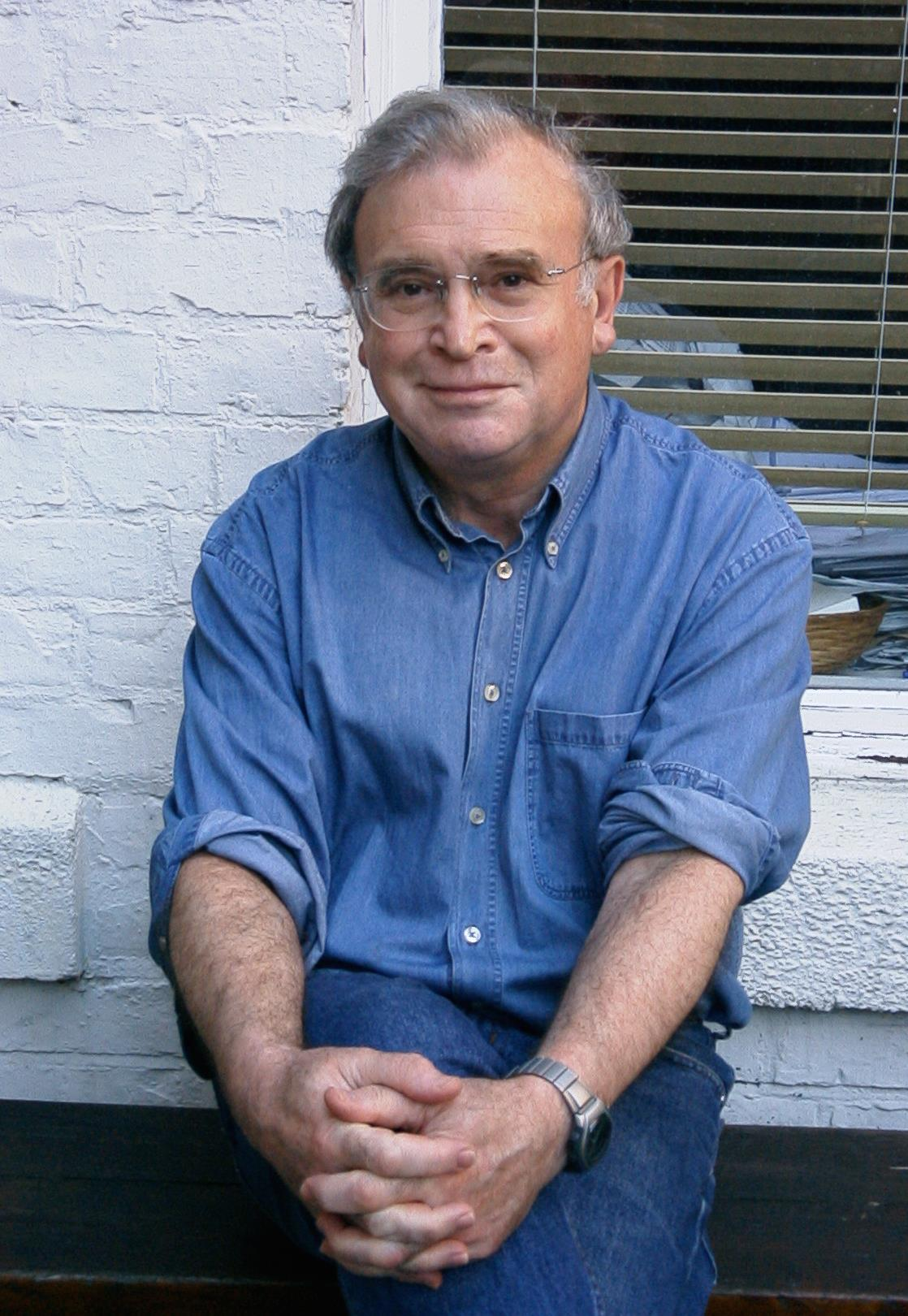
- Долуханов Павел Маркович
- Born: January 1, 1937; Leningrad, USSR
- Died: December 6, 2009 (aged 72); Newcastle upon Tyne
- Education: Leningrad State University
- Known for: Research focused on paleoecology and archeology, in particular on the adaptation of archaeological cultures to environmental changes
- Scientific career
- Fields: Archaeology, Paleogeography
- Workplaces: Institute of History of Material Culture; University of Newcastle

Pavel Dolukhanov (January 1, 1937, Leningrad, USSR – December 6, 2009, Newcastle, UK) was a doctor of geographical sciences, professor, emeritus professor (2002), Russian and British paleogeographer and archaeologist at the Institute of History of Material Culture (IHMC), RAS (1959–1989) and the University of Newcastle, United Kingdom (1990–2009), a specialist in archaeology and paleoenvironment of Northern Eurasia. He taught and made research at the Leningrad State University, the University of Newcastle (UK), the Institute of Paleontology in Paris and the International Research Center (Kyoto, Japan).

== Biography ==
Pavel Dolukhanov was born January 1, 1937, in Leningrad. His father was a professor at the Electrical Engineering Institute. In 1959 he graduated from the geography department of Leningrad State University with a degree in geography and geomorphology and joined the laboratory of archaeological technology at the Leningrad branch of the Institute of Archaeology of the Academy of Sciences of the USSR (now IHMC RAS) under the supervision of Professor Sergei Rudenko. Starting as a senior laboratory assistant, in 1988 Dolukhanov was appointed head of the laboratory.

In 1965 Dolukhanov completed his master’s thesis "Late and Postglacial History of the Baltic Sea and the Archaeological Cultures in its Basin," and in 1985 his doctoral thesis "Development of Environment and Economy of the Primitive Population of Eastern Europe and Asia Minor in the late Pleistocene-Holocene period".

== Research ==
His main areas of research focused on paleoecology and archaeology, in particular on the adaptation of archaeological cultures to environmental changes. Dolukhanov was one of the first in the Soviet Union to realize the enormous possibilities afforded by radiocarbon dating in a variety of historical studies.

Since 1960s Dolukhanov began to analyze the problem of the history and archaeological cultures of the Baltic region. He participated in expeditions in the Pskov and Smolensk regions, in the excavation and exploration in the Kaliningrad region, and Paleolithic expeditions on the territory of Moldova and Russia. Dolukhanov led a paleogeographical group, which conducted the drilling of lakes and marshes in the North-West Russia, reconstructing paleoclimatic changes and exploring the history of the lakes and the Baltic Sea. Dolukhanov traveled almost throughout the entire Soviet Union and participated in field works in Turkmenistan, Uzbekistan, and Siberia, in central Russia, Ukraine and Moldova.

Dolukhanov led international projects funded by INTAS, UNESCO, and the European Union, which involved researchers attached to IHMC RAS, the Hermitage Museum, St. Petersburg University, the Institute of Limnology of the Russian Academy of Sciences, the University of Newcastle, and other research centers. Under his leadership, archaeological teams investigated the problem of the emergence of agriculture on the territory of the Russian Plain, waterways and migration of the ancient population of the North-West Russia and the Black Sea and the Mediterranean corridor, as well as the adaptation of crops to changing sea levels. His academic works are distinguished by a combination of organic methods of geographical sciences, ecology and archaeology, and the creative use of statistical and mathematical methods in archaeology.

He was the author and co-author of monographs and articles published by Russian and international publishing houses and journals.

== Trivia ==
In addition to his scientific work, Pavel Dolukhanov wrote fiction that was published in magazines in Russia and Finland. In 2003, a collection of his stories, "Russian Season" and posthumously in 2010 - the novel "Leningrad-Tbilisi" (ed. Limbus Press., 2009) under the pseudonym Pavel Dolokhov.

== Main publications ==
- История Балтики, Москва, Наука, 1969, С. 117.
- География каменного века, Москва, Наука, 1979, С. 151.
- Multivariate Analysis of Upper Palaeolithic and Mesolithic Stone Assemblages (with J. K. Kozlowski and S. K. Kozlowski), Warsaw–Kraków, Uniwersytet Jagiellonski – PAN, 1980, 103 pp.
- История Средиземных морей, Москва, Наука, 1988, С. 141.
- Ecology and Economy in Neolithic Eastern Europe, Duckworth, London and St. Martin’s Press, New York, 1984, 212 pp.
- Environment and Ethnicity in the Ancient Near East. Avebury, Aldershot, 1994, 406 pp. (перевод на турецкий: Imge Kitabevi Publishers, Ankara, 1998).
- Cultural Transformations and Interactions in Eastern Europe, edited jointly with J. C. Chapman. Avebury, Aldershot, 1994, 256 зp.
- The Early Slavs. Eastern Europe from the Initial Settlement to the Kievan Rus. Longman, New York, 1996, 321 pp.
- Landscape in Flux. Central and Eastern Europe in Antiquity, edited jointly with J. C. Chapman. Oxbow Books, Oxford, 1997, 340 pp.
- Quaternary of Northern Eurasia: Late Pleistocene and Holocene Landscapes, Stratigraphy and Environments. Edited jointly with A. A. Velichko, N. W. Rutter and N. R. Catto. Quaternary International, vols 41/42. Pergamon Press, 1997, 191 pp.
- Источники этноса, С. Петербург, Европейский дом, 2000, С. 220
- Archaeology in Russia. Dossier-Archéologia. Special issue, January 2002, edited jointly with M. Séfériadès.
- Радиоуглеродная хронология неолита Северной Евразии, С. Петербург, Теза, 2004, С. 158.
- The East European Plain on the Eve of Agriculture. Edited jointly with G. R. Sarson and A. M. Shukurov, British Archaeological Reports: International Series 1964, Archaeopress, Oxford, 2009, 246 pp.

== Articles ==
More than 200, including:

- Archaeology and nationalism in totalitarian and post-totalitarian Russia. In: J. A. Atkinson, I. Banks and J. O'Sullivan, eds., Nationalism and Archaeology, 1996, pp. 200–213.
- War and peace in prehistoric Eastern Europe. In: J. Carman and A. Harding, eds. Ancient Warfare. Sutton Publ., 1999, p. 73-88
- Alternative revolutions: hunter-gatherers, farmers and stock-breeders in the Northwestern Pontic area. In K. Boyle, C. Renfrew and M. Levine, eds., Ancient Interactions: East and West in Eurasia, McDonald Institute Monographs, Cambridge, 2001, p. 13–24.
- Improved radiocarbon chronology and the colonization of East European Plain by Modern Humans (with Shukurov, A. M. and Sokoloff, D. D). Journal of Archaeological Science, 28,7, 2001: 699–712.
- Modelling the Neolithic Dispersal in Northern Eurasia (with A. Shukurov).Documenta Praehistorica, 2004, 31, 35–47.
- The Holocene environment and transition to agriculture in Boreal Russia (Serteya Valley case study) (with K. A. Arslanov, A. M. Shukurov, A. N. Mazurkevich, L. A. Savelieva, E. N. Djinboridze, M. A. Kulkova and G. I. Zaitseva). Internet Archaeology 17, 2004 doi:10.11141/ia.17.3
- Prehistoric environment, human migrations and origin of pastoralism in Northern Eurasia. In E. M. Scott et al., eds, Impact on Environment on Human Migrations in Eurasia. NATO Scientific Publications, Kluwer Acad. Publ., 2004, 225–232.
- Scythia before the Scythians (with M. L. Séfériadès and V. N. Stanko). Acts of the XIV UISPP Congress, BAR International Series 1271, p. 77–82.
- The chronology of Neolithic dispersal in Central and Eastern Europe (with A. Shukurov, D. Gronenborn, D. Sokoloff, V. Timofeev, G. Zaitseva). Journal of Archaeological Science, 32, 1441–1458, 2005.
- Prehistoric Sites in Northern Armenia (with S. Aslanian, E. Kolpakov and E. Belyaeva). Antiquity Vol 78 No 301. Project Gallery
- Evolution of the waterways and early human migrations in the North-Eastern Baltic area (with V. Timofeev, Kh. Arslanov, G. Zaitseva, E. Nosov and D. Subetto). Geochronometria, 2005, 24, 81–86;
- The role of waterways in the spread of the Neolithic (with K. Davison, G. R. Sarson and A. Shukurov). Journal of Archaeological Science, 2006, 33, 641–652.
