= Mirza Bukhari =

Bukharan philanthropist, collector and industrialist (1848–1893)

- Mirzo Buhari
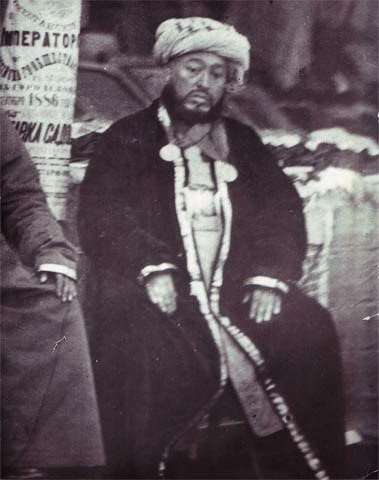
- Born: Mirzo Abdullo Bukhari; 1848; Samarkand, Emirate of Bukhara (now Uzbekistan)
- Died: 1893 (aged 44–45); Mecca, Ottoman Empire (now Saudi Arabia)
- Known for: Philanthropist, collector, industrialist

Mirza Bukhari (Uzbek: Mirzo Abdullo Buhari; 1848–1893) was a Bukharan philanthropist, regional historian, collector and industrialist. He was one of the pioneers of technological production of silk fabrics in Turkestan.

== Biography ==
Mirza Bukhari was born in 1848 in the Samarkand mahallah Toshkandi, populated by artisans from Tashkent and later Bukhara. Mirza's father was engaged in growing grain and passed on the profession, as well as the initial capital, to his son by inheritance. However, the young entrepreneur did not limit himself to agriculture, and already in 1865 he opened a weaving enterprise for the production of silk fabrics. After Samarkand became part of the Russian Empire, Bukhari abandoned the handicraft production of fabrics and mastered the then modern Russian technologies, becoming one of the founders of machine silk-winding production in Turkestan. Subsequently, Bukhari (or Bukharin, or Abdullin, as he was sometimes called in documents by Russian representatives) received the title of merchant of the second guild. Fabrics produced by the young entrepreneur's factory were exhibited both at exhibitions within the Russian Empire and abroad, for example, in Paris, where he was awarded two silver medals for the production of silk fabrics, silk embroidery on fabric and velvet.

Mirza Bukhari was also planned to participate in the World's Columbian Exposition, dedicated to the 400th anniversary of the discovery of America, but the exhibition was postponed to a later date, so Bukhari did not go there, since he was in his homeland in Samarkand, where a cholera epidemic swept through in the fall of 1892. Bukhari himself avoided the disease, and as a devout Muslim, he decided to make a pilgrimage to Mecca, where he went in May–June 1893. However, the cholera epidemic reached there as well. As a result, Bukhari still fell ill with this disease, as a result of which he died. Several publications of that time reported on Bukhari's death, in particular, the Samarkand newspaper Okraina published a message on 11 October 1893 that "the merchant Bukharin died in Mecca from cholera. He left behind an inheritance of more than 80 thousand rubles and a valuable archaeological collection." The Muslim newspaper Terciman, published in Crimea by Ismail Gasprinsky, also reported that the Samarkand merchant Mirza Bukharin died during the Hajj.

== Collecting and patronage ==
Mirza Bukhari collected antiques throughout his entire adult life, his collection included ancient coins, metal and ceramic items, and jewelry. An additional impetus to Bukhari's collecting was given by a meeting with archaeologist Nikolay Veselovsky, who had arrived for the excavations of Afrasiab, and whom he was introduced to by the head of the Samarkand district, orientalist Georgy Arandarenko. During the guest's very first visit, Bukhari gave Veselovsky over a thousand gold, silver, and copper coins, signet rings, women's jewelry, and ceramic items. In 1887, Bukhari also visited Saint Petersburg, where he also met Veselovsky, who arranged for him to take tours of the city and invited him to a meeting of the Eastern Branch of the Russian Archaeological Society, and also introduced him to the Saint Petersburg akhund Ayatullah Bayazitov. On December 18 of the same year, Mirzo Bukhari was granted an audience with the Russian Emperor Alexander III and the royal family at the Gatchina Palace. It is interesting that Bukhari spoke Russian poorly, and his clerk, Vasily Zhukov, a resident of Samarkand, helped him as a translator. The trip to Saint Petersburg and the visit to the emperor's court left a strong impression on Bukhari, which he himself wrote about in his article published in the Turkestan Veloyatining Gazetasi newspaper.

As a token of gratitude, Bukhari, who returned to Samarkand, presented the Administrative Office of the Russian Emperor with a list of 43 antiquities found in Samarkand and Bukhara. In the spring of 1888, first in Turkestan Veloyatining Gazetasi and then in Turkestan Vedomosti, a detailed note by Bukhari on the acquisitions from the Afrasiab settlement was published. The Chairman of the Imperial Archaeological Commission, Count Bobrinsky, became interested in the collection and asked the Turkestan governor-general to submit the collection for consideration by the commission. In October 1888, with the consent of the owner, 6,300 exhibits were sent from Samarkand to Saint Petersburg, most of which were transferred to the Russian side and exhibited in the Hermitage. Thus, Bukhari contributed to the preservation of cultural heritage. He refused to sell exhibits to foreign scientists and merchants, including the president of the French Geographical Society, explaining his refusal by the desire to preserve the collection exclusively for scientific study and only in his own country. For example, Bukhari was one of the largest suppliers of exhibits for the Tashkent Museum. For just one donation in 1883, he transferred over a hundred artifacts to the museum, including coins, jewelry, and seals. The famous Uzbek poet Furqat lived in Bukhari's house for some time.
