= Maikop kurgan =

Kurgan (burial site) in Southern Federal District, Russia

The Maikop kurgan (Russian: Майкопский курган), excavated by Nikolay Veselovsky in 1897 near Maikop, Southern Russia, is the eponym of the Early Bronze Age Maikop culture of the Northern Caucasus.

The kurgan had a height of about 10 m and a circumference of about 200 m. It revealed the burial of a supposed priest-king with rich grave goods, including golden and silver bull figurines, as well as two burials of women. The finds are conserved in the Hermitage Museum.

According to David W. Anthony, the author of the book The Horse, the Wheel, and Language, the Maikop burial was contemporary with the first cities of Middle and Late Uruk period Mesopotamia, 3700–3100 BCE.

== Gallery ==
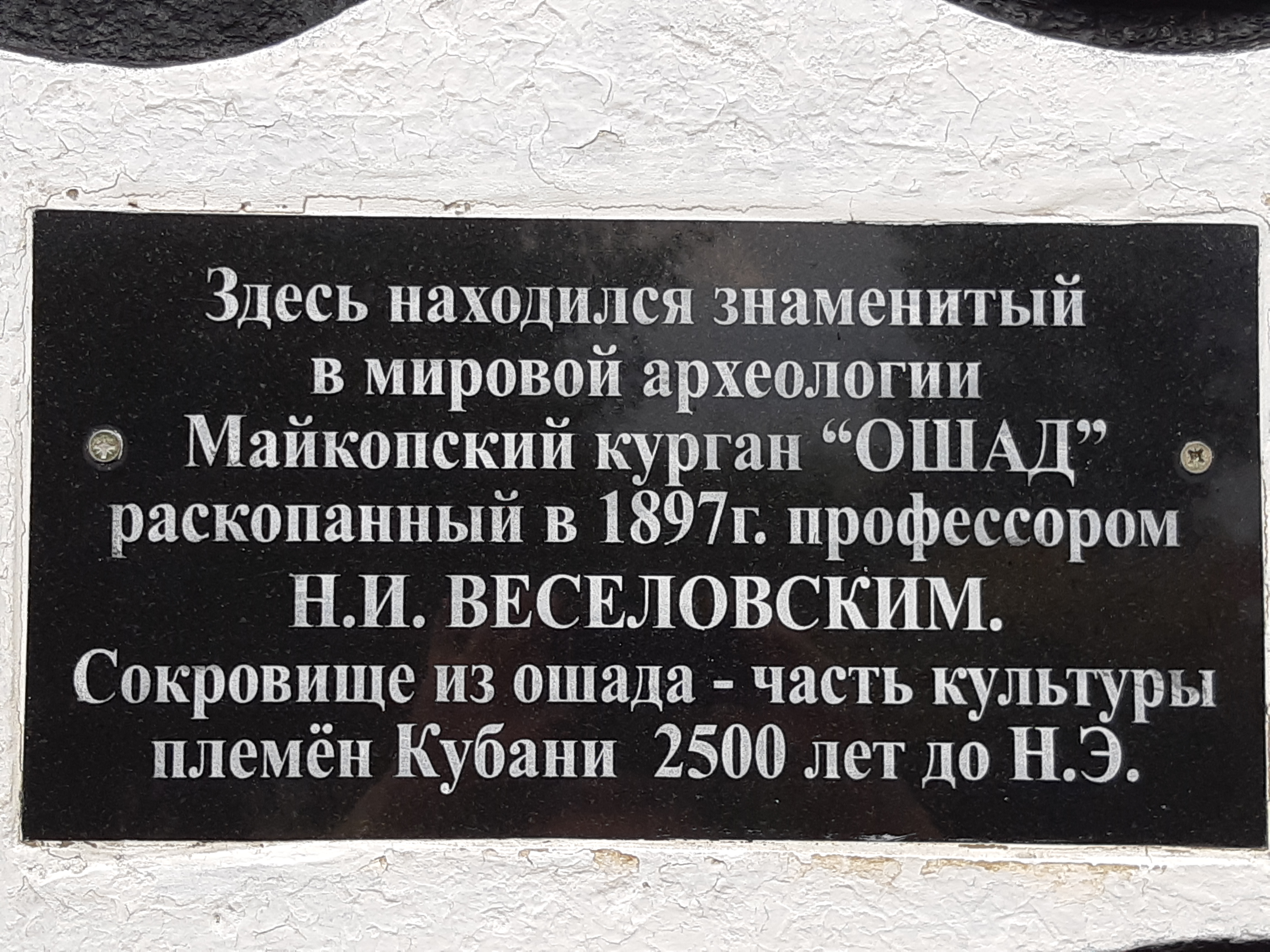
Information board

== Literature ==
- Philip P. Betancourt, The Maikop Copper Tools and Their Relationship to Cretan Metallurgy, American Journal of Archaeology (1970).
- Philip L. Kohl, The Making of Bronze Age Eurasia, Cambridge World Archaeology (2007), ISBN 978-0-511-26695-9, pp. 73ff.
- Brian Murray Fagan, The Oxford Companion to Archaeology (1996), ISBN 0-19-507618-4, p. 398.
