= Environmental statistics =

Application of statistical methods to environmental science

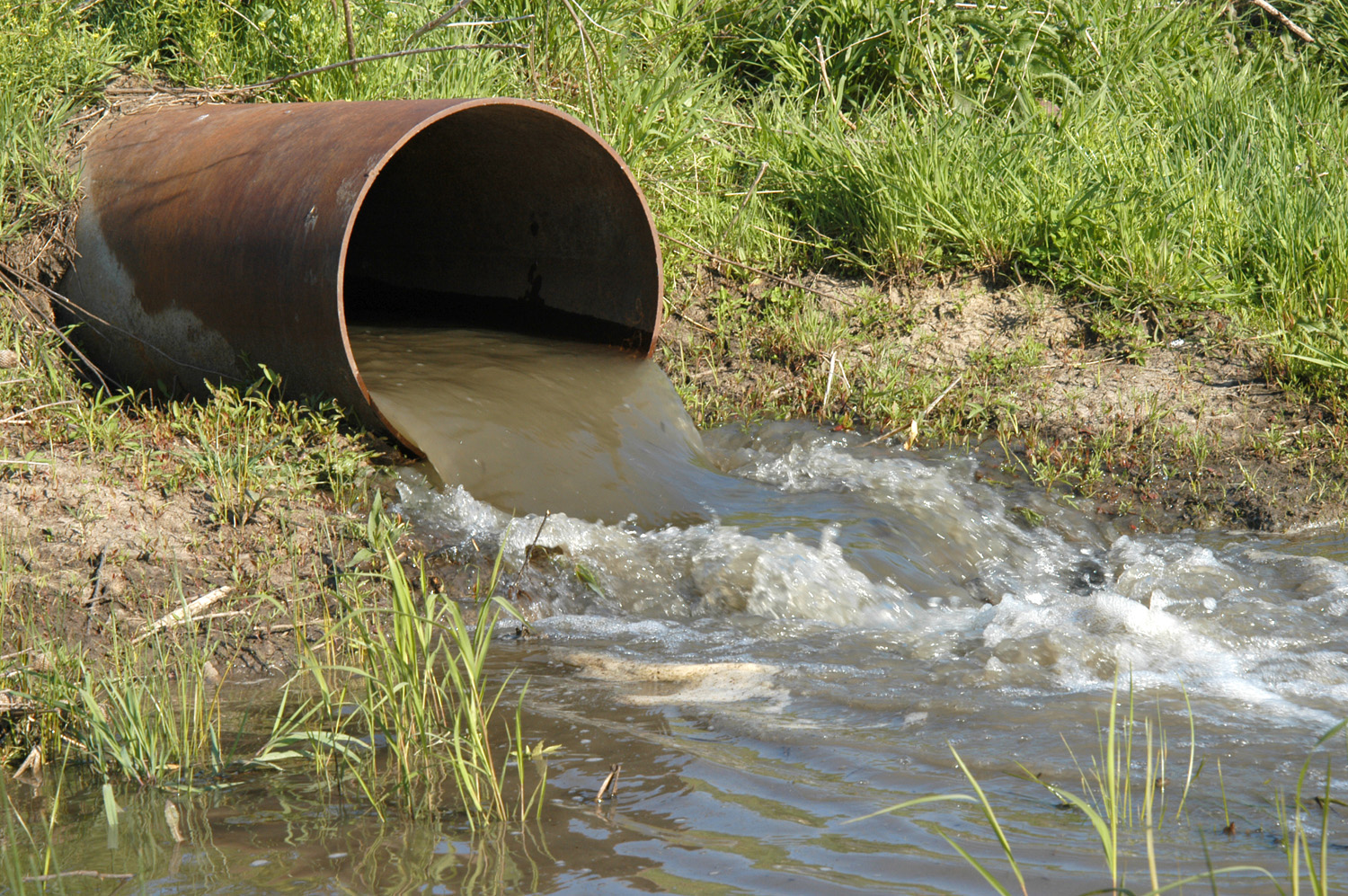
A discharge pipe as a potential source of pollution that can be investigated using environmental statistics.

Environmental statistics is a branch of statistics that uses statistical methods to study environmental issues, including those concerning natural ecosystems, interactions between humans and the environment, and environmental conditions in places where people live.

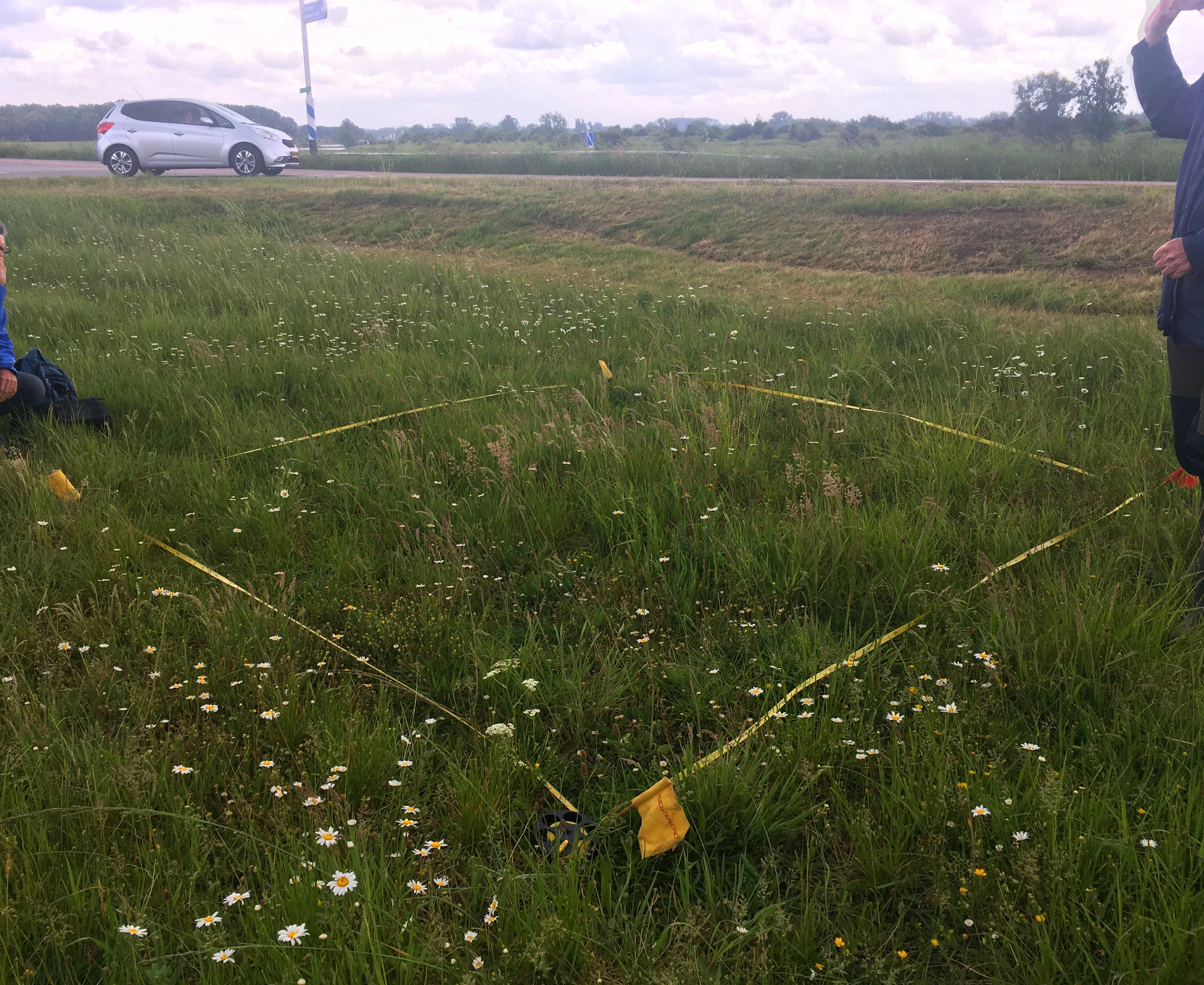
Determining the size and location of grassland to be surveyed when collecting samples for an ecological study.

Its applications are numerous and varied, ranging from identifying sources of environmental pollution to planning where and how to collect samples for ecosystems studies. Environmental statistics supports many users, including organizations responsible for public health and safety, environmental protection, and water resources, as well as research institutions involved in environmental studies.

When studying complex environmental issues, it can be difficult to collect data that is reliable and consistent, and then be able to confidently interpret the results. For this reason, environmental statistics plays an essential role in understanding and overcoming these challenges.

== Terminology ==
"Environmental statistics" can refer to both a branch of statistics, which is the subject of this article, and to environmental data that describes the biophysical environment and the socioeconomic factors influencing it. Examples of the latter definition include monthly average temperatures, the area of forest affected by fire, waste generation per unit of GDP, and the proportion of the population using safely managed drinking water services. Although the two terms have different meanings, they both provide useful information for decision-making and supporting sustainable development.

Air quality measurements are being recorded, which can then be analyzed using statistical methods.

"Environmental statistics" has also been used interchangeably with the term, "Environmetrics," however the latter places greater emphasis on developing and improving statistical models. Both fields of study use statistical principles and methods to address environmental issues, and interest in them has grown in the past few decades in response to increasing concerns over environmental issues. Currently, McGill University in Montreal, Canada offers an Environmetrics Concentration within its Environment major, and North Carolina State University in the United States offers courses in Environmental Statistics. These programs help prepare the next generation of statisticians and environmental professionals to address emerging environmental challenges.

== Evolution of Environmental Statistics ==
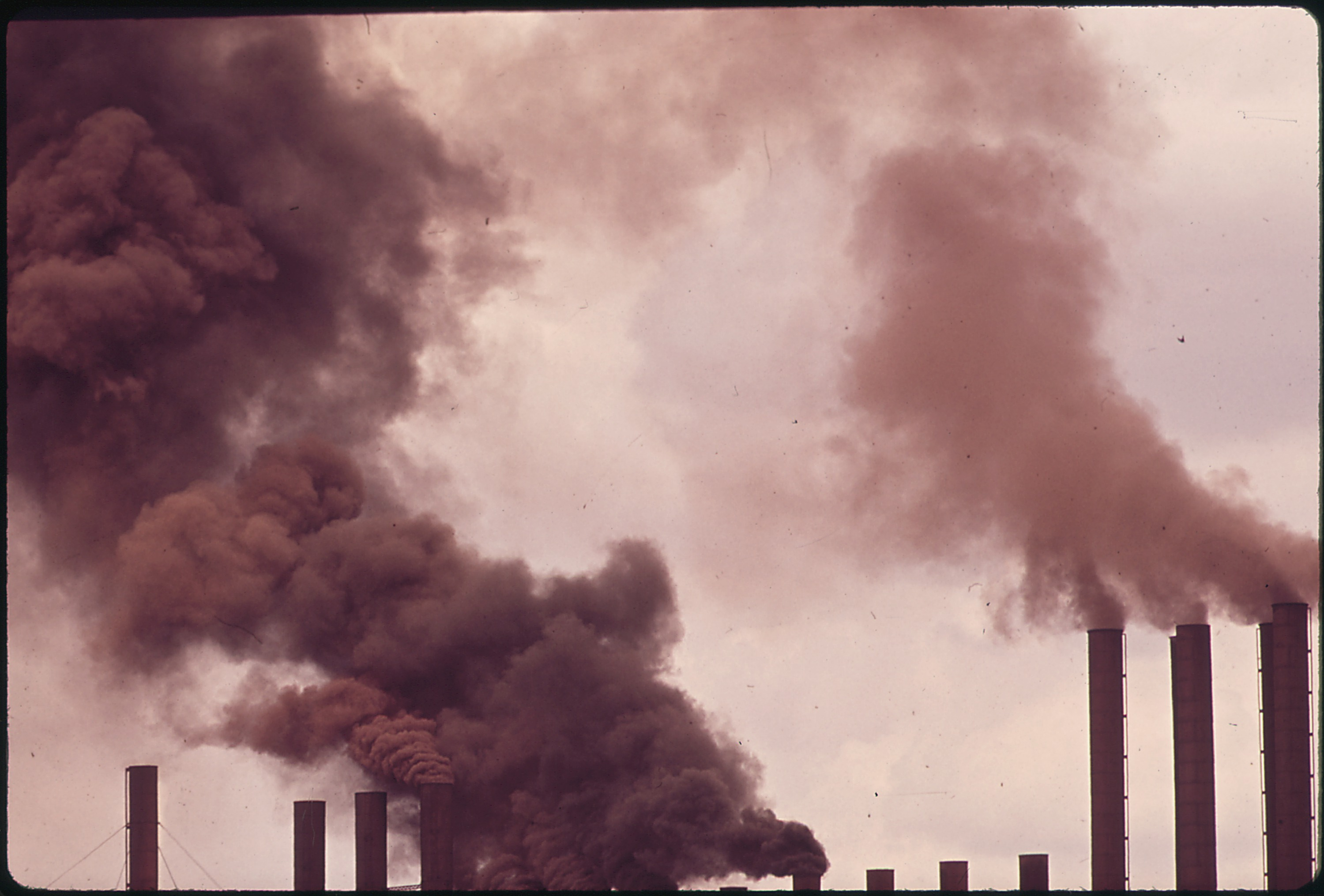
Steel plant chimneys releasing pollutants into the atmosphere in the 1970s.

Environmental statistics emerged as an important field of study in the 1970s, following the establishment of the United States Environmental Protection Agency (EPA) in 1970, the passage of the United States Clean Air Act (1970), and the signing of the Great Lakes Water Quality Agreement (1972). Growing concerns over acid rain and pollution during this period further increased the demand for statistical methods to support the development of environmental quality standards, improve air and water quality monitoring, and analyze environmental data.

Flooding following an extreme rainfall event.

Between 2010 and 2020, advances in climate modelling and statistical analysis helped scientists to better understand how human activities affect climate change and more accurately assess changes in the frequency and intensity of extreme weather events.

Environmental statistics is becoming increasingly computational, with advances in computer technology and software, allowing for more sophisticated analyses of climate related hazards, such as extreme precipitation, heat domes, and wildfires.

== Environmental Studies and Statistical Methods ==
Environmental statistics involves two main approaches: descriptive and inferential statistics.

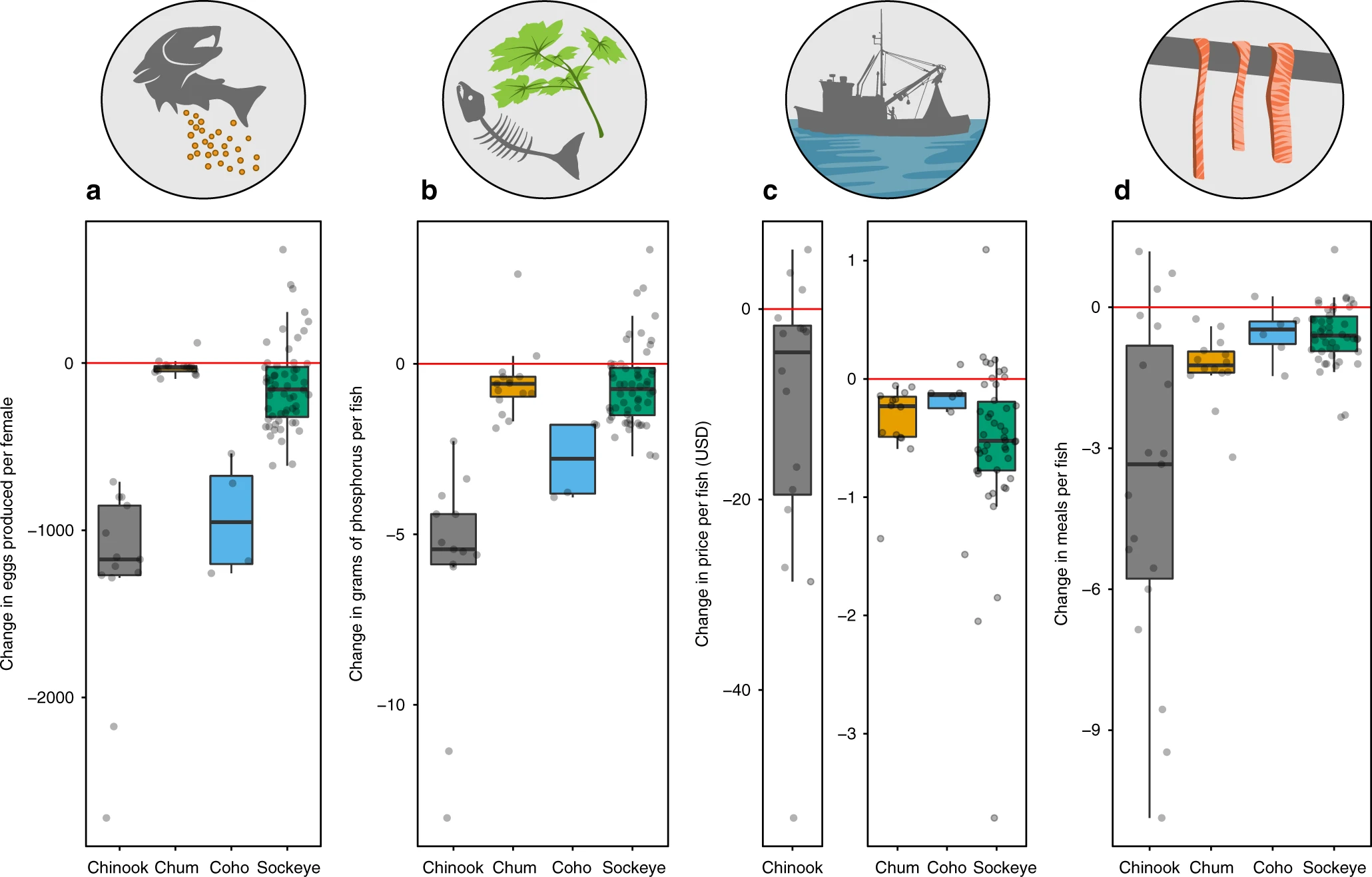
Using descriptive statistics and quantitative estimates, the environmental and economic consequences of declining salmon size can be predicted.

Descriptive statistics use numerical measures such as averages and percentages to describe data, while inferential statistics uses sample data to test hypotheses or make predictions about the environmental conditions.

These approaches can be used in different types of studies, including baseline studies, targeted studies, and regular environmental monitoring. Baseline studies establish existing environmental conditions so that future changes can be measured. Targeted studies assess the potential environmental impacts of a planned change or accident. Environmental monitoring helps detect changes in the environment over time.

A wide range of statistical methods is used in environmental science, reflecting the many different ways they can be applied. While many of these techniques are used in other fields, they often need to be modified to account for the challenges of interpreting environmental data, particularly the difficulty of controlling environmental variables.

Key examples of statistical methods and their applications include:

- Regression models: Examine relationships between environmental variables and estimate how changes in one variable are associated with changes in another.
- Scientific statistical sampling: Design efficient methods for collecting environmental data, while considering cost and accessibility.
- Extreme value and data transformation: Analyze extreme events and unusual observations and address challenges associated with outliers and data distribution.
- Risk assessment and uncertainty analysis: Evaluate environmental risks and uncertainties to support the development of environmental standard and regulations.
- Spatial statistics and time series modelling: Examine how environmental conditions and extreme events may vary over time and across locations.

In some cases, a combination of methods may be necessary to ensure a more comprehensive analysis and minimize the risk of drawing erroneous conclusions.

== Environmental Sampling Methods ==
Data must be collected in environmental statistics so as to preserve random selection of samples, ensuring that no systematic biases are introduced to the data, as study results may be falsified. Therefore, strategies to effectively collect data while eliminating bias are used by researchers to ensure random sampling . Most sample collection methods fit into the two categories: designs to extend simple random sampling, and specialized techniques for environmental sampling.

Methods of Extending Simple Random Sampling

- Systematic sampling is conducted by selecting a sample size (n) from a population (N), and an interval of sample collection (k) is calculated by taking the quotient of N and n, where a sample is randomly collected.
- Stratified random sampling splits the population into strata based on unique characteristics, random sampling then occurs in each strata.
- Cluster sampling is a method that places population elements into groups based on a common theme shared by elements placed into each cluster.
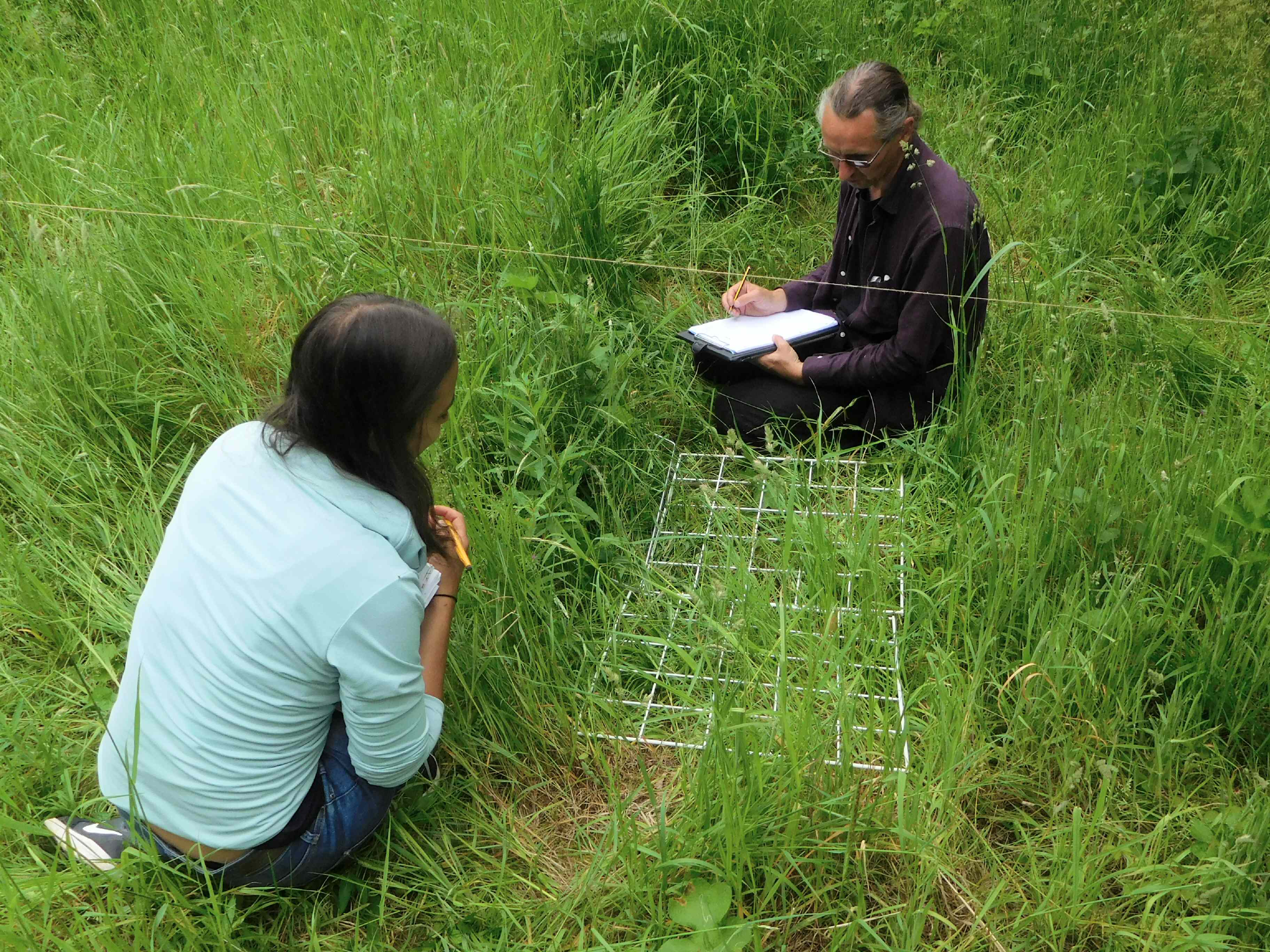
  Transect and quadrat sampling are used in this case to observe the plant species in the quadrats, which are placed every 2 metres along the transect line.

Specialized Techniques for Environmental Sampling

- Capture recapture sampling is conducted by unambiguously marking elements of a population's sample (n), releasing the marked elements back into the population, the population is split into samples again where elements are randomly collected, and the elements with the previous marking are counted.
- Quadrat sampling occurs by counting elements occupying a given area using a frame to measure areal units known as quadrats.
- Line-intercept sampling is a variant of quadrat sampling, where instead of using a quadrat frame over an area a transect line is used to identify population elements of interest.
- Morphometrics is a branch of mathematical shape analysis that addresses the shape comparisons to meet the interest of scientists.
- Time series measure environmental conditions or elements, to record responses at specified observation stations / ecological locations over a number of time points.

== Examples of Environmental Sampling ==
Environmental samples and the strategies used to measure them can take many forms, such as a time series of the morphometry of different fish species passing through an optical fish counter, and understanding fish migration movements with capture recapture techniques.

This is an example of what a fish counter may look like, where fish would swim through, triggering optical sensors to measure the morphometry of a fish of interest passing through.

Optical Fish Counters: This describes the methods employed by sites such as Riverwatcher Daily that keeps reports of fish species such as salmon and trout moving up and down rivers, including the Ganaraska, and Credit rivers in Ontario, also measuring the sizes of fish travelling, and morphometrics to gain a better understanding of the sizes and number of migratory fish travelling up and down rivers.

Trout Tagging Programs on the Lees Ferry Reach:

Capture recapture techniques like tagging can help researchers understand population fluxes and gauge metrics like size.

The Lees Ferry reach is a 25 kilometre stretch of the Colorado River that is continually stocked with nonnative rainbow trout to support sport fishery. Since initial trout stocking in 1964 dam operations and flow regimes have affected this fishery. Researchers found it useful to determine the effects of flow regulation and dam operations on fish life histories. To better understand the rainbow trout population metrics after high-flowing experiments, a taggling program was used with the intentions of providing information in future years on fish movement and growth.

== Environmental Statistics in Practice ==
Environmental statistics are widely used by government agencies, such as the United States Environmental Protection Agency, to inform decisions about environment protection and policy development. Although the following two case studies are historical examples, they illustrate how environmental statistics can influence change at the national level by informing the development of environmental standards and supporting the implementation of regulations.

An example of log-linear regression modelling: one of the statistical methods used to examine the relationship between levels of lead in the blood and IQ scores in children.

National Ambient Air Quality Standard (NAAQS) for Lead: In 2008, the United States Environmental Protection Agency (EPA) lowered the national air quality standard for lead by 90%, from 1.5 to 0.15 μg/m³. Regression analysis was used to examine the relationship between lead exposure and children's IQ scores, log-linear regression helped estimate health effects at lower levels of exposure, and concentration-response modelling was used to estimate how risks change with different levels of lead exposure. This case study demonstrates how environmental statistics can inform government policies and support science-based decision making.

A groundwater monitoring well is being installed to collect groundwater sample for contamination assessment.

United States Environmental Protection Agency (EPA) Unified Guidance: In 2009, the U.S. EPA published the reported titled Statistical Analysis of Groundwater Monitoring Data at RCRA Facilities, Unified Guidance, which was provided to regulators and waste-management facilities on how to evaluate groundwater quality and meet the requirements of the Resource Conservation and Recovery Act (RCRA).

The guidance included statistical methods for distinguishing natural variations in groundwater quality from significant changes in contamination concentrations, which helped determine whether changes in groundwater quality could be due to contamination from waste-management facilities. The statistical methods discussed included Student's t-tests, analysis of variance (ANOVA), confidence intervals, and regression analysis, and also addressed the risk of false positive and false negative results.

== Future Challenges and Opportunities ==
Over the past 50 years, environmental statistics has evolved from a field focused on environmental monitoring to one that uses statistical models and computational methods to examine environmental problems.

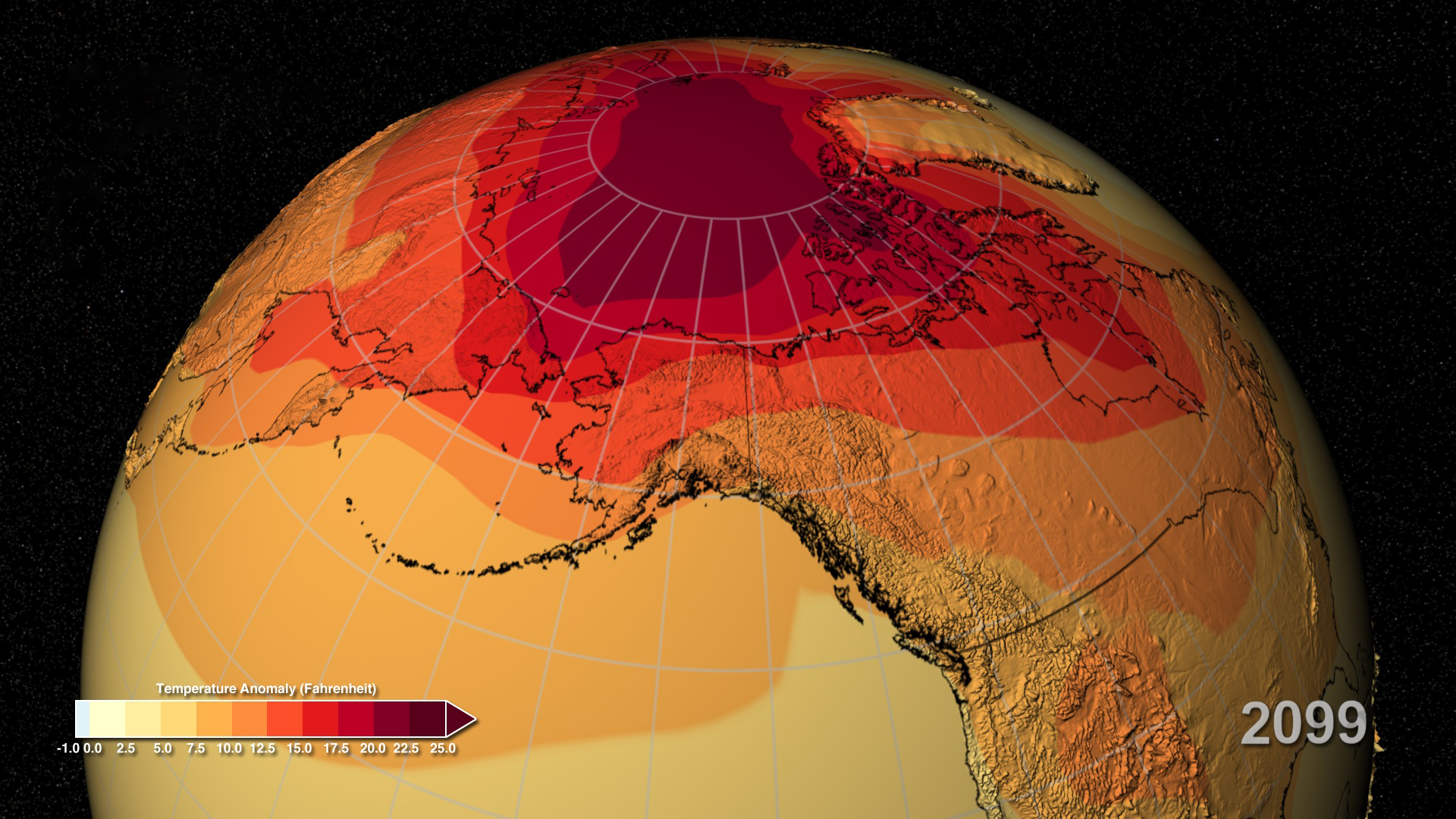
Climate models are used to predict global warming trends but different models may result in different predictions.

One of the key challenges for the future is quantifying the uncertainty associated with future climate change projections as different climate models may produce different predictions, making it necessary to develop statistical methods that can better measure and interpret this uncertainty.

A second challenge is assessing the effects of climate change mitigation efforts at smaller geographic scales. For example, it may be difficult to know whether a reduction in greenhouse gas emissions was real or the result of natural climate variability without statistical models.

A third challenge is accounting for all of the various factors that may influence an environmental event. For example, when predicting the chance of flooding after heavy rainfall, it is necessary to consider multiple factors such as the intensity and duration of the rainfall, the presence of plants that can absorb water, and the slope of the land.

Through collaboration with practitioners, researchers, government agencies, and the public, new discoveries in environmental statistics emerge. Supporting the next generation of environmental statisticians may aid in advancing research, informing policies, and contributing to a more sustainable future.

== See also ==
- Coordination of Information on the Environment
- Environmental studies
- Statistics
