= Novotitarovskaya culture =

Archaeological culture in North Caucasus

Novotitarovskaya
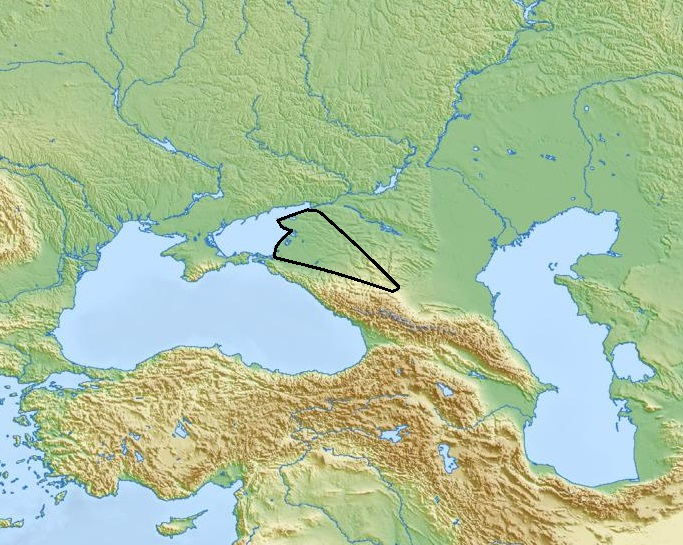
- Geographical range: North Caucasus
- Period: Early Bronze Age
- Dates: ca. 3300–2700 BC
- Preceded by: Yamnaya culture
- Followed by: Catacomb culture

Novotitarovskaya culture (miswritten Novotitorovka culture) was a Bronze Age archaeological culture which flourished in the North Caucasus ca. 3300–2700 BC.

The Novotitarovskaya culture was located immediately to the north of and largely overlapped portions of the Maykop culture. It faced the Sea of Azov, running from the Kerch Strait eastwards, almost to the Caspian, roughly congruent with the modern Krasnodar Krai region of Russia.

It is distinguished by its burials, particularly by the presence of wagons in them and its own distinct pottery, as well as a richer collection of metal objects than those found in adjacent cultures, as is to be expected considering its relationship to the Maykop culture.

It is grouped with the larger Yamnaya culture complex, often supposed as bearer of the Indo-European languages. In common with it, the economy was semi-nomadic pastoralism mixed with some agriculture.

== Sources ==
- Mallory, J. P.; Adams, Douglas Q. (1997). Encyclopedia of Indo-European Culture. Taylor & Francis. ISBN 9781884964985.
