= Novosvobodnaya =

Novosvobodnaya Новосвободная Мамрыкъуай
- Stanitsa
- Location within Republic of Adygea Location within Russia
- Coordinates: 44°21′N 40°24′E
- Country: Russia
- Region: Adygea
- District: Maykopsky District
- Time zone: UTC+3:00

Novosvobodnaya (Russian: Новосвободная; Adyghe: Мамрыкъуай) is a rural locality (a stanitsa) in Abadzekhskoye Rural Settlement of Maykopsky District, Russia. The population was 591 as of 2018. There are 25 streets.

It was the site of executions and burials during the Civil War.

== Geography ==
Novosvobodnaya is located 37 km southeast of Tulsky (the district's administrative centre) by road. Sevastopolskaya is the nearest rural locality.
