= Maykop culture =

Bronze Age civilization in the Caucasus (c. 3700–3000 BC)

- Alternative names: Maikop, Majkop
- Geographical range: Eurasian Steppe
- Period: Bronze Age
- Dates: c. 3700 BC – 3000 BC
- Preceded by: Darkveti-Meshoko
- Followed by: Yamnaya culture, Novosvobodnaya culture

The Maykop culture or Maikop culture (Russian: майкоп, [mɐjˈkop], scientific transliteration: Majkop,), c. 3700 BC – 3000 BC, is a major archaeological culture of the Bronze Age in the western Caucasus region.

It extends along the area from the Taman Peninsula at the Kerch Strait to near the modern border of Dagestan and southwards to the Kura River. The culture takes its name from a royal burial, the Maykop kurgan, in the Kuban River valley.

According to genetic studies on ancient DNA published in 2018, the Maykop population came from the south, from Imereti, and was descended from the Chalcolithic farmers known as Darkveti-Meshoko who first colonized the north side of the Caucasus. Maykop is therefore the "ideal archaeological candidate for the founders of the Northwest Caucasian language family".

== Territory ==
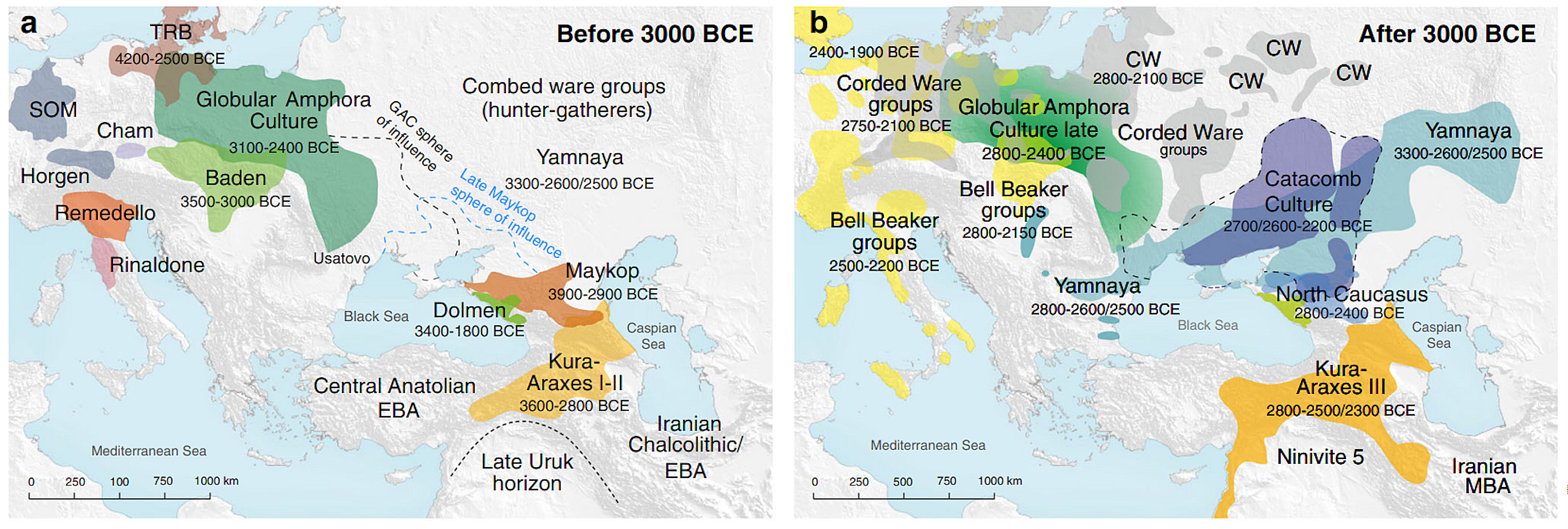
The Maykop culture ( ) and distribution of archaeological cultures in Europe and Caucasus before and after 3000 BC.

In the south, the Maykop culture bordered the approximately contemporaneous Kura–Araxes culture (3500–2200 BC), which extends into the Armenian Plateau and apparently influenced it. To the north is the Yamnaya culture, including the Novotitarovskaya culture (3300–2700), which it overlaps in territorial extent. It is contemporaneous with the late Uruk period in Mesopotamia.

The Kuban River is navigable for much of its length and provides an easy water-passage through the Sea of Azov to the territory of the Yamnaya culture, along the Don and Donets River systems. The Maykop culture was thus well-situated to exploit the trading possibilities with the central Ukraine area.

Radiocarbon dates for various monuments of the Maykop culture are from 3950 – 3650 – 3610 – 2980 calBC.

After the discovery of the Leyla-Tepe culture in the 1980s, some links were noted with the Maykop culture.

The Leyla-Tepe culture is a culture of archaeological interest from the Chalcolithic era. Its population was distributed on the southern slopes of the Central Caucasus, in the Aghdam District of modern Azerbaijan, from 4350 until 4000 B.C. Similar amphora burials in the South Caucasus are found in the Jar-Burial Culture of western Georgia.

The Leyla-Tepe culture has also been linked to the Ubaid period monuments, in particular with the settlements in the Eastern Anatolia region. The settlement is of a typical Western-Asian variety, with the dwellings packed closely together and made of mud bricks with smoke outlets.

It has been suggested that the Leyla-Tepe were the founders of the Maykop culture. An expedition to Syria by the Russian Academy of Sciences revealed the similarity of the Maykop and Leyla-Tepe artifacts with those found recently while excavating the ancient city of Tel Khazneh I, dated to the 4th millennium BC.

In 2010, nearly 200 Bronze Age sites were reported stretching over 60 miles from the Kuban River to Nalchik, at an altitude of between 4,620 feet and 7,920 feet. They were all "visibly constructed according to the same architectural plan, with an oval courtyard in the center, and connected by roads."

== Culture ==
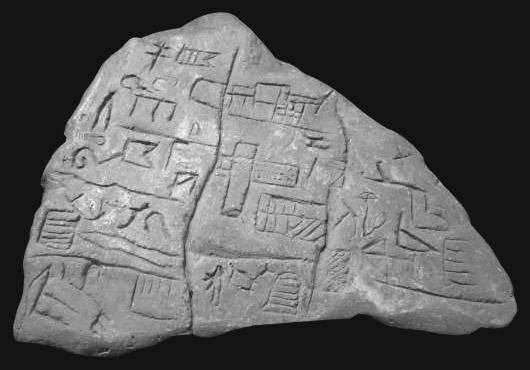
Maykop plate with petroglyphs.

The Maikop Culture in the northern Caucasus was concurrent with the Kura-Araxes Culture in the south of the Caucasus and the Uruk period in Mesopotamia. The finds in the Maikop kurgan (tumulus) and other kurgans of the Maikop Culture are still regarded as unique to this day. More than 7000 objects of gold and some 1000 of silver are known. Nowhere else in the Early Bronze Age world of the second half of the 4th millennium BC has such a large number of exquisite gold and silver items come to light.

— Hansen (2014)

=== Art ===
In the early 20th century, researchers established the existence of a local Maykop animal style in the artifacts found. This style was seen as the prototype for animal styles of later archaeological cultures: the Maykop animal style is more than a thousand years older than the Scythian, Sarmatian and Celtic animal styles.

Attributed to the Maykop culture are petroglyphs which have yet to be deciphered.

=== Horse breeding ===
The Maykop people lived sedentary lives, and horses formed a very low percentage of their livestock, which mostly consisted of pigs and cattle.

Archaeologists have discovered a unique form of bronze cheek-piece, which consists of a bronze rod with a twisted loop in the middle that threads through the nodes and connects to the bridle, halter strap, and headband. Notches and bumps on the edges of the cheek-pieces were, apparently, to attach nose and under-lip straps.

Some of the earliest wagon wheels in the world are found in Maykop culture area. The two solid wooden wheels from the kurgan of Novokorsunskaya in the Kuban region have been dated to the second half of the fourth millennium.

=== Terrace agriculture ===
The construction of artificial terrace complexes in the mountains is evidence of their sedentary living, high population density, and high levels of agricultural and technical skills. The terraces were built around the fourth millennium BC. and all subsequent cultures used them for agricultural purposes. The vast majority of pottery found on the terraces are from the Maykop period, the rest from the Scythian and Alan period. The Maykop terraces are among the most ancient in the world, but they are little studied. The longevity of the terraces (more than 5000 years) points to a tradition of landscape engineering.

== Origins ==
=== Colchis region ===
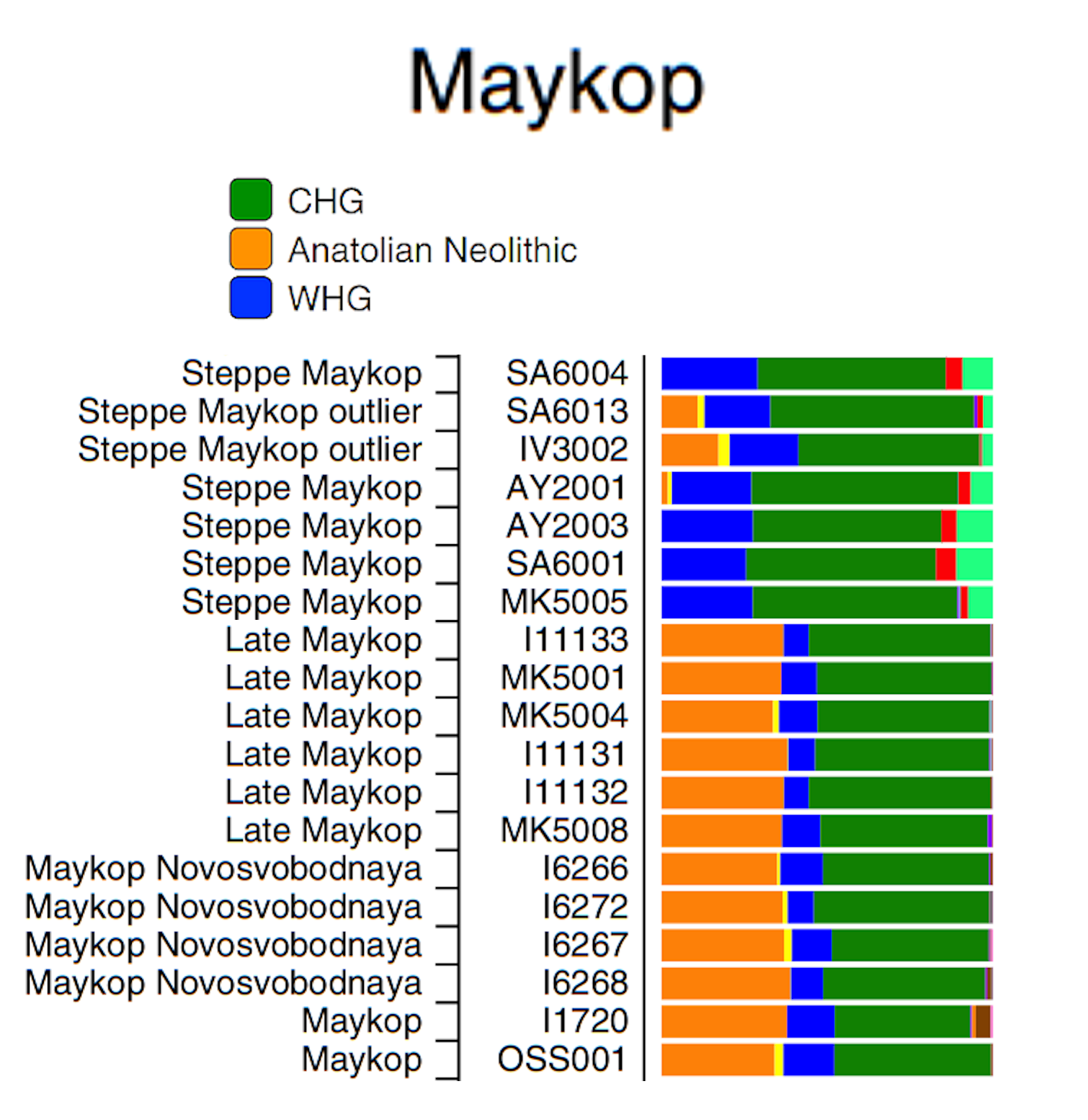
Admixture analysis of various Maykop culture populations

Based on Wang (2018), David W. Anthony (2019) notes that "the Maikop population was descended from the Chalcolithic farmers [that] came from the south, probably from western Georgia [the Darkveti-Meshoko culture], and are the ideal archaeological candidate for the founders of the Northwest Caucasian language family." He also notes that the Bronze Age Maykop individuals tested by Wang (2018) could not have contributed to the Yamnaya gene pool, Yamnaya being the archeological culture most likely connected to the spread of Indo-European languages. Wang (2018) further found that 'Steppe Maykop' (a population related to the Maykop culture) probably had a minor East Asian-related component, which was estimated at ~6.9% of their ancestry, relating them to Ancient North Eurasians (Upper Palaeolithic Siberians AG3, MA1) and Native Americans.

=== Pontic–Caspian steppe ===
Its burial practices resemble the burial practices described in the Kurgan hypothesis of Marija Gimbutas, and it has been speculated that the Maykop culture may have contributed to the Yamnaya culture which is nowadays recognised as the ancestor of most Indo-European languages. According to a 2019 article by David Anthony,

Most Yamnaya genomes studied to date exhibit admixed EHG (Eastern Hunter Gatherer) & CHG (Caucasus Hunter Gatherer) ancestry with each in robust proportions, often with CHG ancestry higher than 50%... the Maikop culture (3600-3000 BC) is regarded in many scenarios as the likely source of the CHG that mixed with steppe EHG mating networks to create the Yamnaya genetic synthesis.

However, more detailed studies cast doubt on this scenario. The Maykop DNA contains quite a large admixture (30%–40%) of Anatolian Farmer ancestry. Anthony continues:

This mixture was too rich in Anatolian Farmer genes to have contributed much to the Yamnaya gene pool, which had only 10–18% Anatolian Farmer ancestry, and most of that arguably derived from the west, from Globular Amphorae and late Tripol’ye populations... This partial description of the genetic data, if it stands, suggests that Maikop was not the source of most of the CHG that amounts to half of Yamnaya ancestry. This is because CHG was already in the steppes long before Maikop.

According to J.P. Mallory, writing in 1987 before ancient DNA evidence became available:

... where the evidence for barrows is found, it is precisely in regions which later demonstrate the presence of non-Indo-European populations.

Anthony agrees that the Maykop culture people probably spoke languages which are ancestral to the Northwest Caucasian languages found in the same region today. Nonetheless, their culture seems to have influenced that of the early Indo-Europeans. Anthony writes:

I also accept the general consensus that the appearance of the hierarchical Maikop culture about 3600 BC had profound effects on pre-Yamnaya and early Yamnaya steppe cultures. Yamnaya metallurgy borrowed from the Maikop culture two-sided molds, tanged daggers, cast shaft hole axes with a single blade, and arsenical copper. Wheeled vehicles might have entered the steppes through Maikop, revolutionizing steppe economies and making Yamnaya pastoral nomadism possible after 3300 BC.

=== Iranian Plateau ===
According to Mariya Ivanova the Maykop origins were on the Iranian Plateau:

Graves and settlements of the 5th millennium BC in North Caucasus attest to a material culture that was related to contemporaneous archaeological complexes in the northern and western Black Sea region. Yet it was replaced, suddenly as it seems, around the middle of the 4th millennium BC by a “high culture” whose origin is still quite unclear. This archaeological culture named after the great Maykop kurgan showed innovations in all areas which have no local archetypes and which cannot be assigned to the tradition of the Balkan-Anatolian Copper Age. The favoured theory of Russian researchers is a migration from the south originating in the Syro-Anatolian area, which is often mentioned in connection with the so-called “Uruk expansion”. However, serious doubts have arisen about a connection between Maykop and the Syro-Anatolian region. The foreign objects in the North Caucasus reveal no connection to the upper reaches of the Euphrates and Tigris or to the floodplains of Mesopotamia, but rather seem to have ties to the Iranian plateau and to South Central Asia. Recent excavations in the Southwest Caspian Sea region are enabling a new perspective about the interactions between the “Orient” and Continental Europe. On the one hand, it is becoming gradually apparent that a gigantic area of interaction evolved already in the early 4th millennium BC which extended far beyond Mesopotamia; on the other hand, these findings relativise the traditional importance given to Mesopotamia, because innovations originating in Iran and Central Asia obviously spread throughout the Syro-Anatolian region independently thereof.

=== Azerbaijan ===
More recently, some very ancient kurgans have been discovered at Soyuqbulaq in Azerbaijan. These kurgans date to the beginning of the 4th millennium BC, and belong to Leylatepe Culture. According to the excavators of these kurgans, there are some significant parallels between Soyugbulaq kurgans and the Maykop kurgans:

"Discovery of Soyugbulaq in 2004 and subsequent excavations provided substantial proof that the practice of kurgan burial was well established in the South Caucasus during the late Eneolithic [...] The Leylatepe Culture tribes migrated to the north in the mid-fourth millennium, B.C. and played an important part in the rise of the Maikop Culture of the North Caucasus."

== See also ==
- Lola culture
- Yamnaya culture
- Cucuteni-Trypillia culture
- Varna culture
- Koban culture

== Sources ==
- Ivanova, Mariya (2007). "The Chronology of the 'Maikop Culture' in the North Caucasus: Changing Perspectives". Armenian Journal of Near Eastern Studies. 2: 7–39.
- J. P. Mallory, "Maykop Culture", Encyclopedia of Indo-European culture, Fitzroy Dearborn, 1997.
- Р.М. Мунчаев, Н.Я. Мерперт, Ш.Н. Амиров ТЕЛЛЬ-ХАЗНА I. Культово-административный центр IV–III тыс. до н. э. в Северо-восточной Сирии. Издательство «Палеограф». Москва 2004. ISBN 5-89526-012-8
