= Indo-European migrations =

Migrations out of the Proto-Indo-European homeland

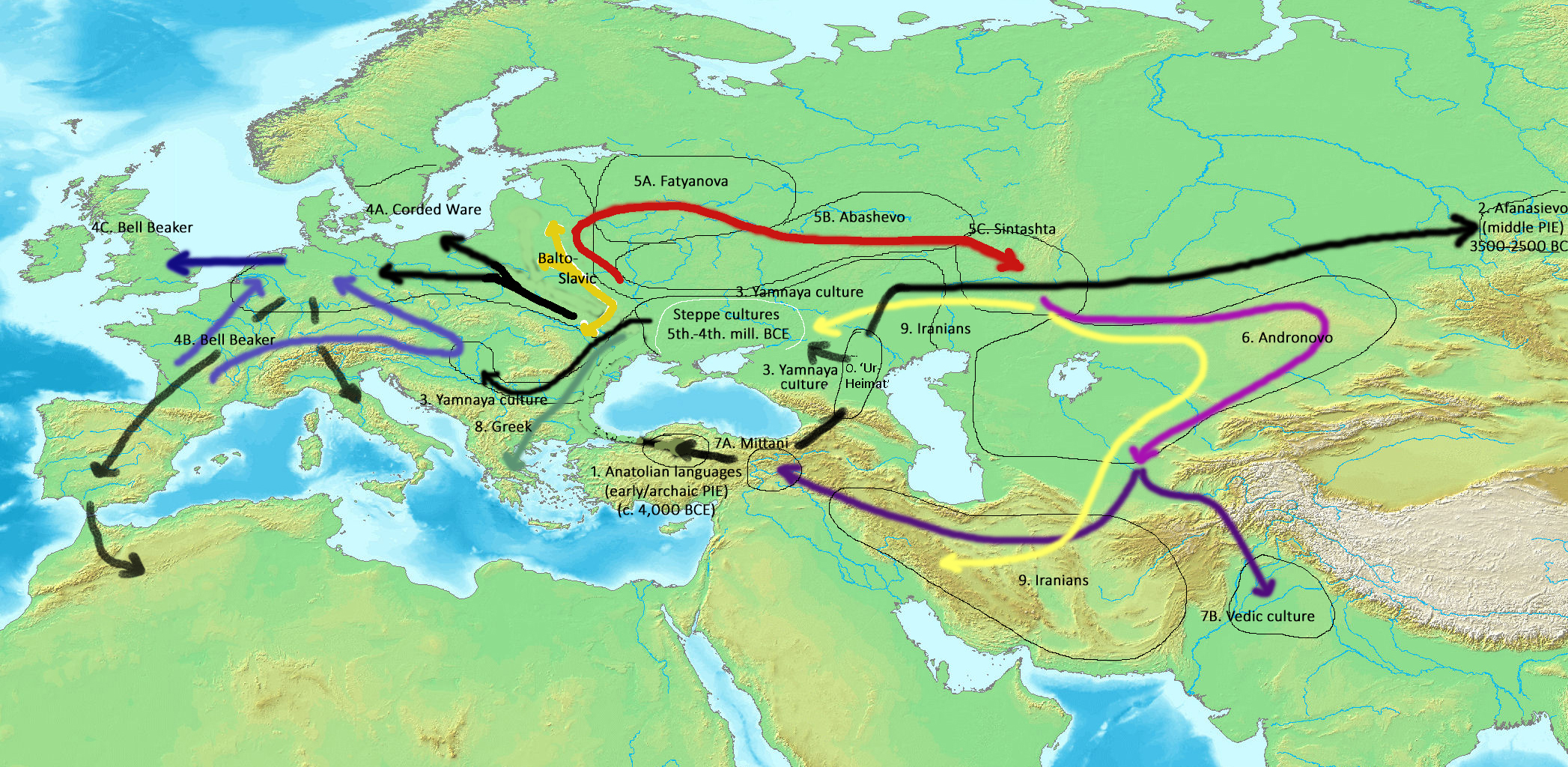
Scheme of Indo-European language dispersals from c. 4000 to 1000 BCE according to the widely held Kurgan hypothesis: Center: Steppe cultures; 0 Urheimat; 1 (black): Anatolian languages (archaic PIE); 2 (black): Afanasievo culture (early PIE); 3 (black): Yamnaya culture expansion (Pontic-Caspian steppe, Danube Valley; late PIE); 4A (black): Western Corded Ware; 4B-C (blue and dark blue): Bell Beaker; adopted by Indo-European speakers; 5A-B (red): Eastern Corded ware; 5C (red): Sintashta (proto-Indo-Iranian); 6 (magenta): Andronovo; 7A (purple): Indo-Aryans (Mittani); 7B (purple): Indo-Aryans (India); [NN] (dark yellow): proto-Balto-Slavic; 8 (grey): Greek; 9 (yellow): Iranians; Not drawn are Armenian, expanding from Catacomb culture into the South Caucasus.

The Indo-European migrations are hypothesized migrations of peoples who spoke Proto-Indo-European (PIE) and the derived Indo-European languages, which took place from around 4000 to 1000 BCE, explaining how these related languages came to be spoken across a large area of Eurasia, spanning from the Indian subcontinent and Iranian plateau to Atlantic Europe.

While these early languages and their speakers are prehistoric (lacking documentary evidence), a synthesis of linguistics, archaeology, anthropology and genetics has established the existence of Proto-Indo-European and the spread of its daughter dialects through migrations of large populations of its speakers, as well as the recruitment of new speakers through emulation of conquering elites. Comparative linguistics describes the similarities between various languages governed by laws of systematic change, which allow the reconstruction of ancestral speech (see Indo-European studies). Archaeology traces the spread of artifacts, habitations, and burial sites presumed to be created by speakers of Proto-Indo-European in several stages, from their hypothesized Proto-Indo-European homeland to their diaspora throughout Western Europe, Central Asian, and South Asia, with incursions into East Asia. Recent genetic research, including paleogenetics, has increasingly delineated the kinship groups involved in this movement.

According to the widely held Kurgan hypothesis, or renewed Steppe hypothesis, the oldest Indo-European migration split from the earliest proto-Indo-European speech community (archaic PIE) inhabiting the Volga basin, and produced the Anatolian languages (Hittite and Luwian). The second-oldest branch, Tocharian, was spoken in the Tarim Basin (now western China), after splitting from early PIE spoken on the eastern Pontic steppe. The late PIE culture, within the Yamnaya horizon on the Pontic–Caspian steppe around 3000 BCE, then branched to produce the bulk of the Indo-European languages through migrations to the west and southeast.

== Fundamentals ==
Classification of Indo-European languages. Red: Extinct languages. White: Categories or unattested proto-languages. Left half: Centum languages. Right half: Satem languages.

=== Linguistics ===
Albanian, Greek, and other Paleo-Balkan languages had their core in the Balkans after the Indo-European migrations in the region. Proto-Celtic and Proto-Italic may have developed from Indo-European languages coming from Central Europe to Western Europe after the 3rd millennium BCE Yamnaya migrations into the Danube Valley, while Proto-Germanic and Proto-Balto-Slavic may have developed east of the Carpathian Mountains, in present-day Ukraine, moving north and spreading with the Corded Ware culture in Middle Europe (third millennium BCE).

The Proto-Indo-Iranian language and culture probably emerged within the Sintashta culture (c. 2100–1800 BCE), at the eastern border of the Abashevo culture, which in turn developed from the Corded Ware-related Fatyanovo–Balanovo culture. The Sintashta culture grew into the Andronovo culture (c. 1900–800 BCE), the two first phases being the Fedorovo Andronovo culture (c. 1900–1400 BCE) and Alakul Andronovo culture (c. 1800–1500 BCE). Indo-Aryans moved into the Bactria–Margiana Archaeological Complex (c. 2400–1600 BCE) and spread to the Levant (Mitanni), northern India (Vedic people, c. 1700 BCE). The Iranian languages spread back throughout the steppes with the Scyths, and into Ancient Iran with the Medes, Parthians and Persians from c. 800 BCE.

Alternative theories include Colin Renfrew's Anatolian hypothesis. It suggests a much earlier date for the Indo-European languages, proposing an origin in Anatolia and an initial spread with the earliest farmers who migrated to Europe.

Also, the Armenian hypothesis proposes that the Urheimat of the Indo-European language was south of the Caucasus. While the Armenian hypothesis has been criticized on archeological and chronological grounds, recent genetic research has revived debate.

==== Indo-European languages ====
The approximate present-day distribution of Indo-European branches in their homelands of Europe and Asia. In chronological order of the earliest surviving written attestations of each branch, they are: Hellenic (Greek) Indo-Iranian Italic (Romance) Celtic Germanic Armenian Baltic Slavic Albanian Non-Indo-European languages Dotted and striped areas indicate where multilingualism is common (more visible upon full enlargement of the map).

The Dutch scholar Marcus Zuerius van Boxhorn (1612–1653) noted extensive similarities between various European languages, Sanskrit, and Persian. Over a century later, after learning Sanskrit in India, Sir William Jones detected systematic correspondences; he described them in his Third Anniversary Discourse to the Asiatic Society in 1786, concluding that all these languages originated from the same source. (Note: Jonathan Slocum, What is Historical Linguistics? What are 'Indo-European' Languages?, The University of Texas at Austin) From his initial intuitions there developed the hypothesis of an Indo-European language family consisting of several hundred related languages and dialects. The 2009 Ethnologue estimates a total of about 439 Indo-European languages and dialects, about half of these (221) belonging to the Indo-Aryan sub-branch based in Southern Asian subregion. The Indo-European family includes most major current languages of Europe, of the Iranian plateau, of the northern half of the Indian Subcontinent, and of Sri Lanka, with kindred languages also formerly spoken in parts of ancient Anatolia and Central Asia. With written attestations appearing from the Bronze Age in the form of the Anatolian languages and Mycenaean Greek, the Indo-European family is significant in historical linguistics as possessing the second-longest recorded history, after the Afroasiatic family.

Almost 3 billion native speakers use Indo-European languages, making it by far the largest language family. Many of the 20 world languages with the largest numbers of native speakers are Indo-European. Approximately 60% of all Indo-European language speakers globally speak an Indo-Iranian language, making it the largest branch of the Indo-European language family by number of speakers.

==== Development of the Indo-European languages ====
===== Proto-Indo-European language =====
The (late) Proto-Indo-European language (PIE) is the linguistic reconstruction of a common ancestor of the Indo-European languages, as spoken by the Proto-Indo-Europeans after the split-off of Anatolian and Tocharian. PIE was the first proposed proto-language to be widely accepted by linguists. Far more work has gone into reconstructing it than any other proto-language and it is by far the most well-understood of all proto-languages of its age. During the 19th century, the vast majority of linguistic work was devoted to reconstruction of Proto-Indo-European or its daughter proto-languages such as Proto-Germanic, and most of the current techniques of historical linguistics (e. g. the comparative method and the method of internal reconstruction) were developed as a result.

Scholars estimate that PIE may have been spoken as a single language (before divergence began) around 3500 BCE, though estimates by different authorities can vary by more than a millennium. The most popular hypothesis for the origin and spread of the language is the Kurgan hypothesis, which postulates an origin in the Pontic–Caspian steppe of Eastern Europe.

The existence of PIE was first postulated in the 18th century by Sir William Jones, who observed the similarities between Sanskrit, Ancient Greek, and Latin. By the early 20th century, well-defined descriptions of PIE had been developed that are still accepted today (with some refinements). The largest developments of the 20th century have been the discovery of Anatolian and Tocharian languages and the acceptance of the laryngeal theory. The Anatolian languages have also spurred a major re-evaluation of theories concerning the development of various shared Indo-European language features and the extent to which these features were present in PIE itself.

PIE is thought to have had a complex system of morphology that included inflections (suffixing of roots, as in who, whom, whose), and ablaut (vowel alterations, as in sing, sang, sung). Nouns used a sophisticated system of declension and verbs used a similarly sophisticated system of conjugation.

===== Pre-Proto-Indo-European =====
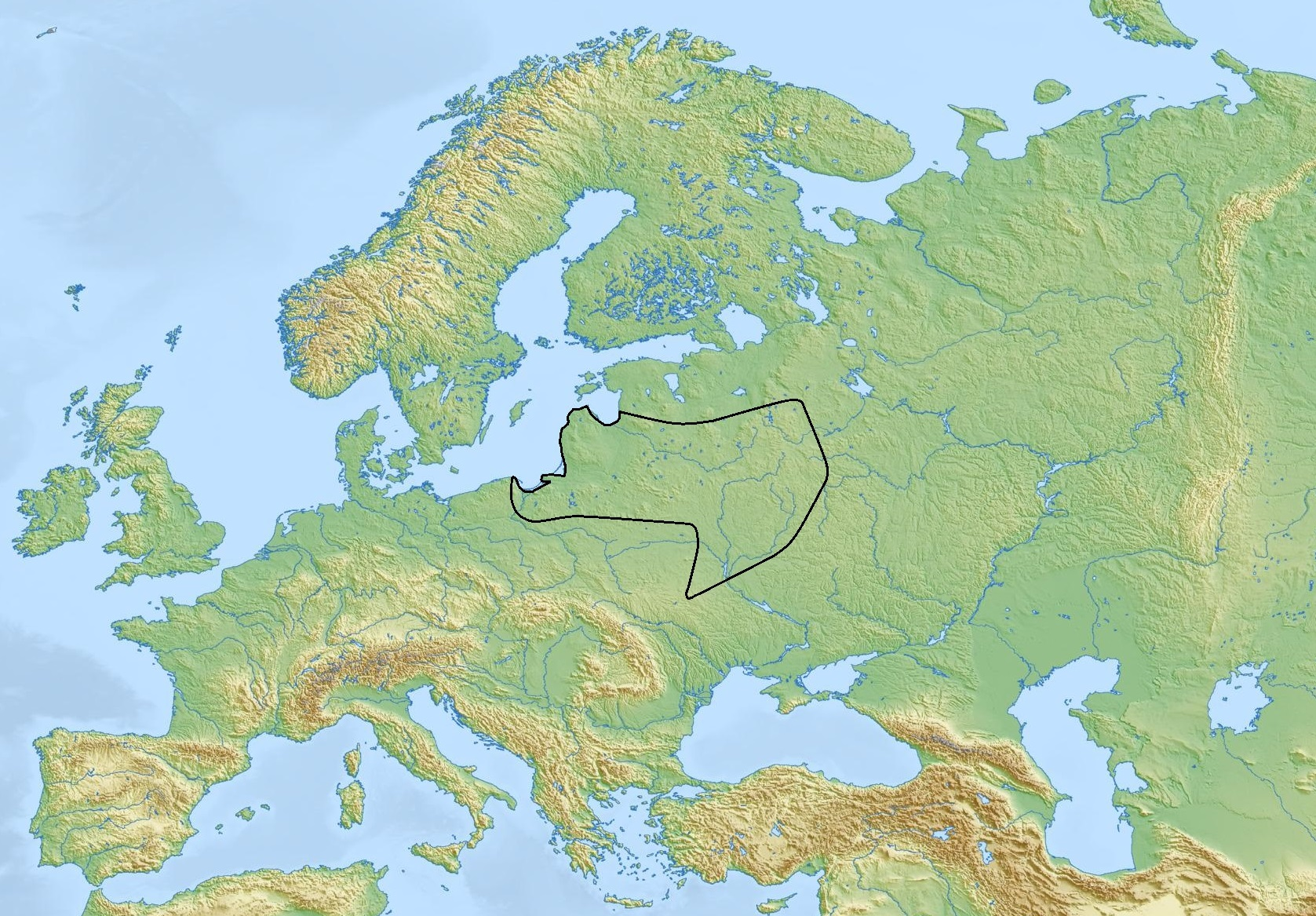
Area of distribution of the earliest Indo-European river names.

Relationships to other language families, including the Uralic languages, have been proposed. Although PIE logically had predecessors,, any proposed relationships remain controversial. There is no written evidence of Proto-Indo-European, so all knowledge of the language is derived by reconstruction from later languages using linguistic techniques such as the comparative method and the method of internal reconstruction. Most linguists recognize there is a limit to linguistic reconstruction, and that reconstructing an ancestral language to Proto-Indo-European might not be possible.

The Indo-Hittite hypothesis postulates that the Anatolian languages (of which Hittite is the most well-known) split off from PIE much earlier than the other Indo-European languages. In this formulation, "proto-Indo-Hittite" refers to the common predecessor of all Indo-European languages including the Anatolian languages, whereas "proto-Indo-European" refers only to the later stage after the Anatolian languages split away. This hypothesis is not widely accepted, and there is little to suggest that it is possible to reconstruct a Proto-Indo-Hittite stage that differs substantially from what is already reconstructed for PIE.

Frederik Kortlandt postulates a shared common ancestor of Indo-European and Uralic, Proto-Indo-Uralic, as a possible pre-PIE. According to Kortlandt, "Indo-European is a branch of Indo-Uralic which was radically transformed under the influence of a North Caucasian substratum when its speakers moved from the area north of the Caspian Sea to the area north of the Black Sea." (Note: Kortlandt (2010) refers to Kortlandt, Frederik. 2007b. C. C. Uhlenbeck on Indo-European, Uralic and Caucasian.)

===== Uralic, Caucasian and Semitic borrowings =====
Proto-Finno-Ugric and PIE have a lexicon in common, generally related to trade, such as words for "price" and "draw, lead". Similarly, "sell" and "wash" were borrowed in Proto-Ugric. Although some have proposed a common ancestor (the hypothetical Nostratic macrofamily), this is generally regarded as the result of intensive borrowing, which suggests that their homelands were located near each other. Proto-Indo-European also exhibits lexical loans to or from Caucasian languages, particularly Proto-Northwest Caucasian and Proto-Kartvelian, which suggests a location close to the Caucasus.

Gramkelidze and Ivanov, using the now largely unsupported glottalic theory of Indo-European phonology, also proposed Semitic borrowings into Proto-Indo-European, suggesting a more southern homeland to explain these borrowings. According to Mallory and Adams, some of these borrowings may be too speculative or from a later date, but they consider the proposed Semitic loans *táwros 'bull' and *wéyh₁on- 'wine; vine' to be more likely. Anthony notes that those Semitic borrowings may have travelled along trade or migration routes.

===== Phases of Proto-Indo-European =====
Spread of IE-languages I

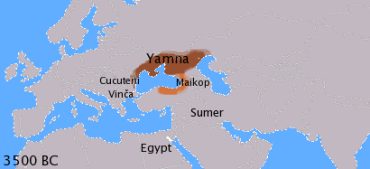
3500 BCE

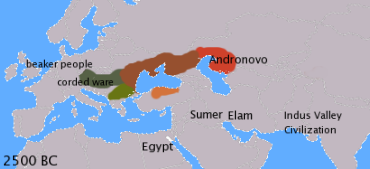
2500 BCE

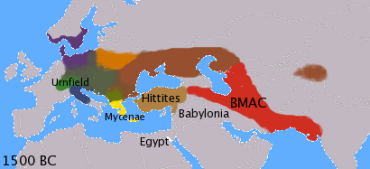
1500 BCE

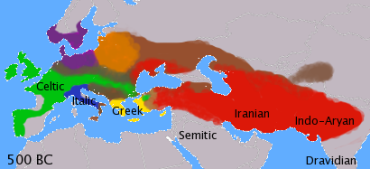
500 BCE

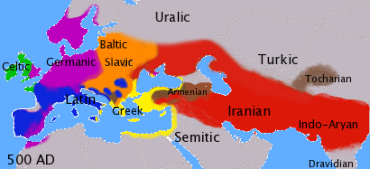
500 CE

Spread of IE-languages II

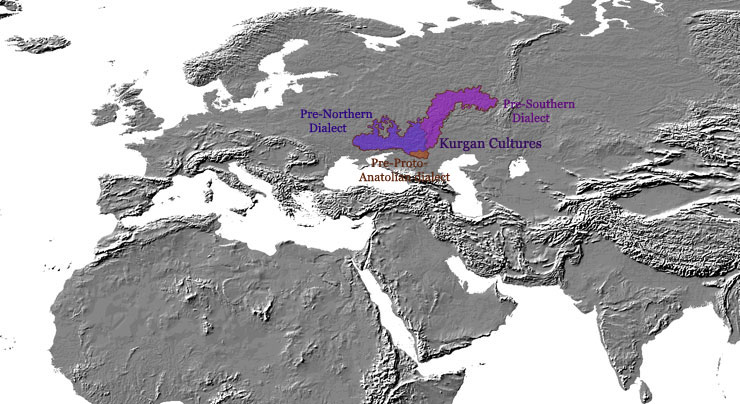
4000 BCE

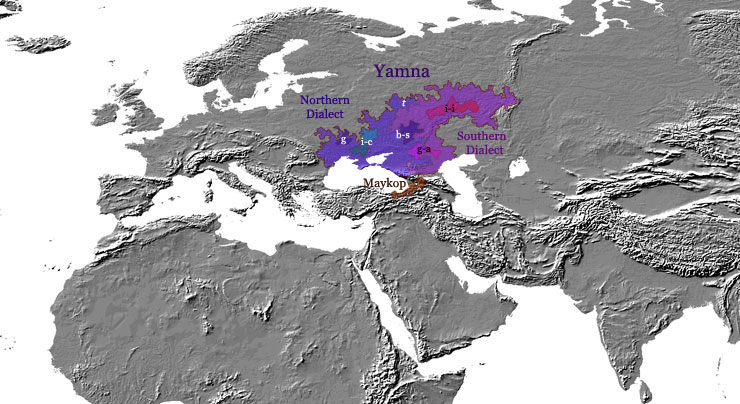
3000 BCE

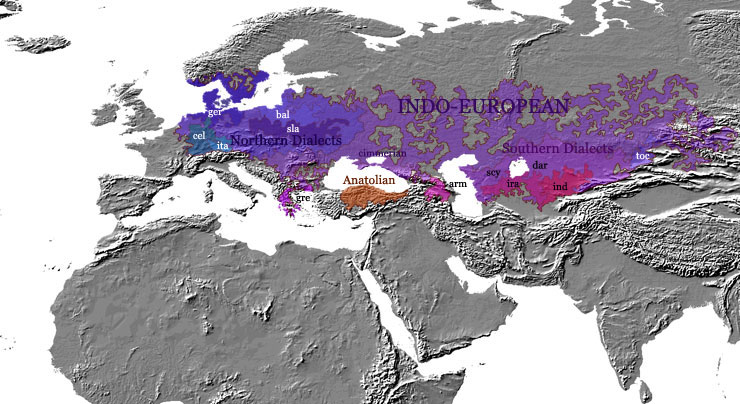
2000 BCE

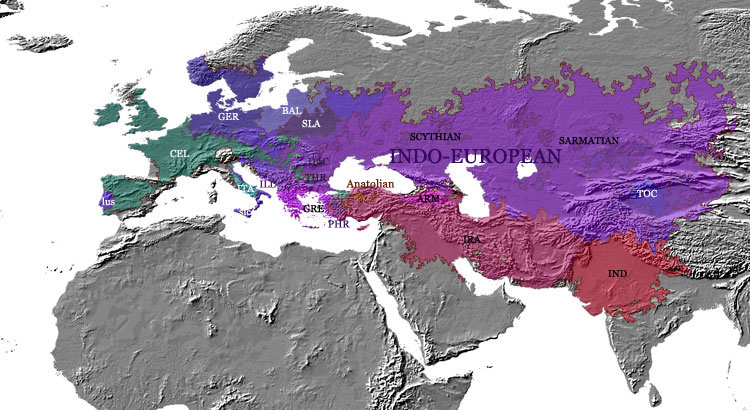
500 BCE

According to Anthony, the following terminology may be used:

- Archaic PIE for "the last common ancestor of the Anatolian and non-Anatolian IE branches";
- Early, core, or Post-Anatolian, PIE for "the last common ancestor of the non-Anatolian PIE languages, including Tocharian";
- Late PIE for "the common ancestor of all other IE branches".

The Anatolian languages are the first Indo-European language family to have split off from the main group. Due to the archaic elements preserved in the now extinct Anatolian languages, they may be a "cousin" of Proto-Indo-European, instead of a "daughter", but Anatolian is generally regarded as an early offshoot of the Indo-European language group.

===== Phylogenetic analysis of Indo-European languages =====
Using a mathematical analysis borrowed from evolutionary biology, but basing their work on comparative vocabulary, a number of researchers have attempted to estimate the dates of the splitting up of the various Indo-European languages. According to the latest study by Kassian et al. (2021), Hittite was the earliest language to split off from the rest, around 4139–3450 BC, followed by the predecessors languages of Tocharian around 3727–2262 BC. Subsequently Indo-European split into four branches ca. 3357–2162 BC: (1) Greek-Armenian, (2) Albanian, (3) Italic-Germanic-Celtic, (4) Balto-Slavic–Indo-Iranian. Balto-Slavic split from Indo-Iranian around 2723–1790 BC, Italic-Germanic-Celtic broke up around 2655–1537 BC, and Indo-Iranian split up around 2044–1458 BC. The position of Albanian is not completely clear, from an insufficiency of evidence.

The authors point out that these dates, which are only approximate, are not inconsistent with the dates established by other methods for the various archaeological cultures which are thought to be associated with Indo-European languages. For example, the date for the Tocharian break-off corresponds to the migration that gave rise to the Afanasievo culture; the date for the Balto-Slavic–Indo-Iranian break-up may be correlated with the end of Corded Ware culture around 2100 or 2000 BC; and the date for Indo-Iranian corresponds to that of the Sintashta archaeological culture, frequently associated with Proto-Indo-Iranian speakers.

=== Archaeology: migrations ===
Origins of Yamnaya culture

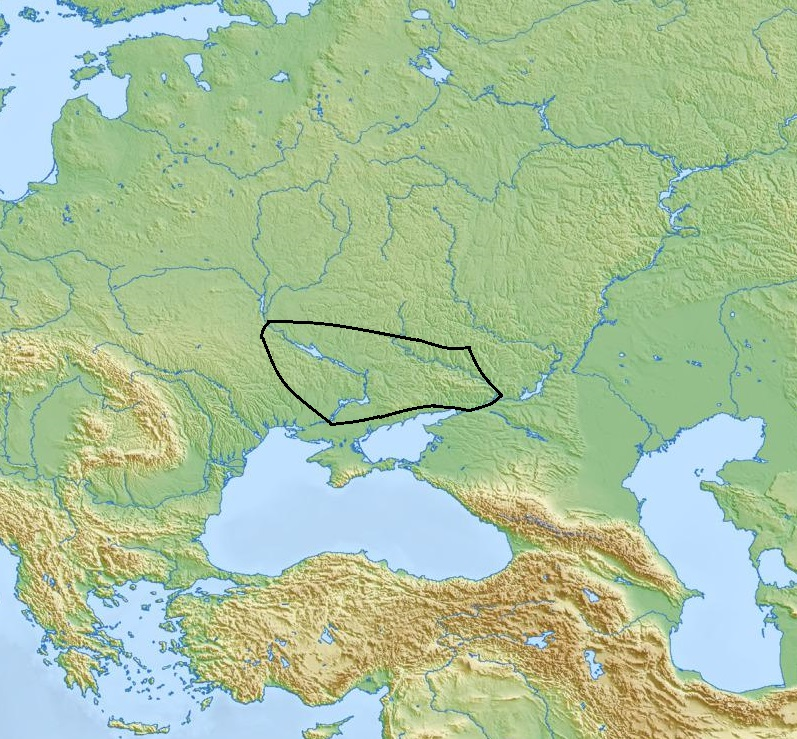
Sredny Stog culture (v.4500–3500 BCE)

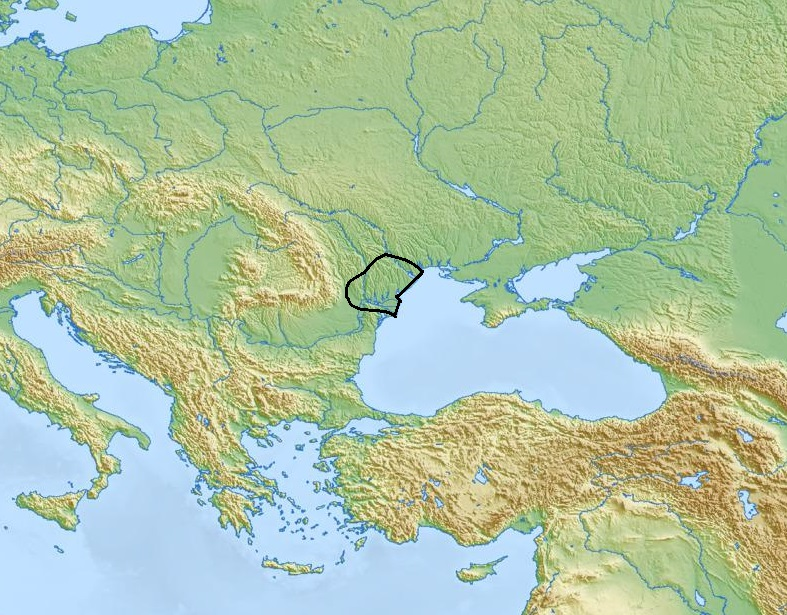
Usatovo culture (c. 3500–3000 BCE)

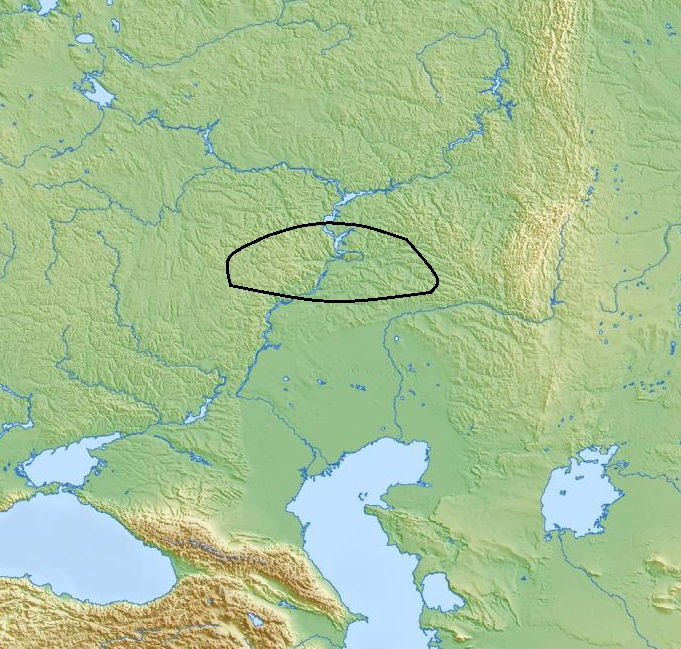
Khvalynsk culture (c. 4900–3500 BCE)

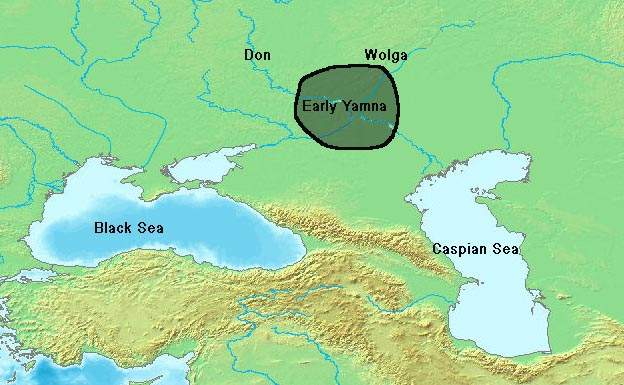
Location of early Yamnaya culture (3400 BCE), according to Anthony 2007

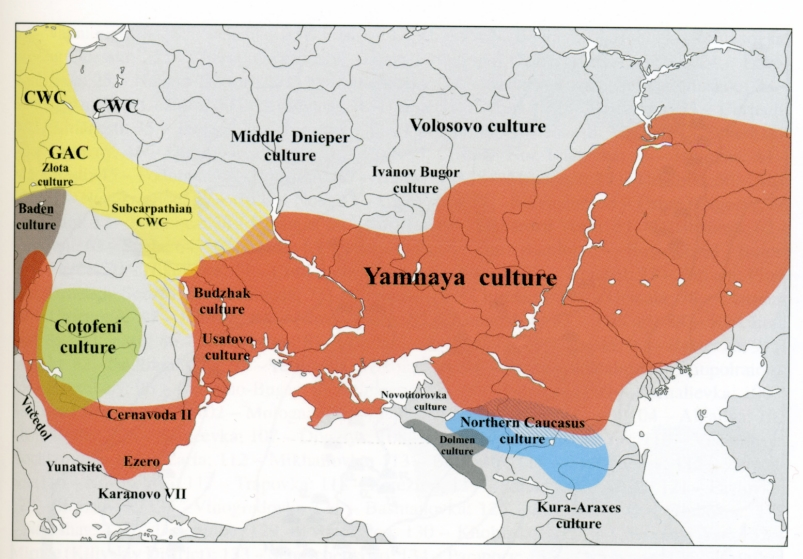
Largest expansion of the Yamnaya culture. Ca. 3500 origins of Usatovo culture; 3400 origins of Yamnaya; c. 3400-3200 expansion of Yamnaya across the Pontic-Caspian steppe; c. 3000 end of Cucuteni–Trypillia culture, and transformation of Yamnaya into Corded Ware in the contact zone east of the Carpathian mountains; 3100-2600 Yamnaya-expansion into the Danube Valley.

Archaeological research has unearthed a broad range of historical cultures that can be related to the spread of the Indo-European languages. Various steppe-cultures show strong similarities with the Yamna-horizon at the Pontic steppe, while the time-range of several Asian cultures also coincides with the proposed trajectory and time-range of the Indo-European migrations.

According to the widely accepted Kurgan hypothesis or Steppe theory, the Indo-European language and culture spread in several stages from the Proto-Indo-European Urheimat in the Eurasian Pontic steppes into Western Europe, Central and South Asia, through folk migrations and so-called elite recruitment. This process started with the introduction of cattle at the Eurasian steppes around 5200 BCE, and the mobilisation of the steppe herder cultures with the introduction of wheeled wagons and horseback riding, which led to a new kind of culture. Between 4500 and 2500 BCE, this "horizon", which includes several distinctive cultures culminating in the Yamnaya culture, spread out over the Pontic steppes, and outside into Europe and Asia. Anthony regards the Khvalynsk culture as the culture that established the roots of Early Proto-Indo-European around 4500 BCE in the lower and middle Volga.

Early migrations at ca. 4200 BCE brought steppe herders into the lower Danube valley, either causing or taking advantage of the collapse of Old Europe. According to Anthony, the Anatolian branch, to which the Hittites belong, probably arrived in Anatolia from the Danube valley.

Migrations eastward from the Repin culture founded the Afanasevo culture which developed into the Tocharians. The Tarim mummies were thought to represent a migration of Tocharian speakers from the Afanasevo culture into the Tarim Basin. yet a 2021 study demonstrates that the mummies are remains of locals descending from Ancient North Eurasians and ancient Northeast Asians; meanwhile, the study suggests instead that Afanasevo migrants might have introduced Proto-Tocharian into Dzungaria during the Early Bronze Age before Tocharian languages were recorded in Buddhist texts dating to 500–1000 CE in the Tarim basin. Migrations southward may have founded the Maykop culture, but the Maykop origins could also have been in the Caucasus.

Late PIE is related to the Yamnaya culture. Proposals for its origins point to both the eastern Khvalynsk and the western Sredny Stog culture; according to Anthony it originated in the Don-Volga area at ca. 3400 BCE.

The western Indo-European languages (Germanic, Celtic, Italic) probably spread into Europe from the Balkan-Danubian complex, a set of cultures in Southeastern Europe. At ca. 3000 BCE a migration of Proto-Indo-European speakers from the Yamna-culture took place toward the west along the Danube river. Slavic and Baltic developed a little later at the middle Dniepr (present-day Ukraine), moving north toward the Baltic coast. The Corded Ware culture in Middle Europe (third millennium BCE), which arose in the contact zone east of the Carpathian mountains, materialized with a massive migration from the Eurasian steppes to Central Europe, probably played a central role in the spread of the pre-Germanic and pre-Balto-Slavic dialects.

The eastern part of the Corded Ware culture contributed to the Sintashta culture (c. 2100–1800 BCE), where the Indo-Iranian language and culture emerged, and where the chariot was invented. The Indo-Iranian language and culture was further developed in the Andronovo culture (c. 1800–800 BCE), and influenced by the Bactria–Margiana Archaeological Complex (c. 2400–1600 BCE). The Indo-Aryans split off around 1800–1600 BCE from the Iranians, whereafter Indo-Aryan groups moved to the Levant (Mitanni), northern India (Vedic people, c. 1500 BCE), and China (Wusun). The Iranian languages spread throughout the steppes with the Scyths and into Iran with the Medes, Parthians and Persians from c. 800 BCE.

=== Anthropology ===
According to Marija Gimbutas, the process of "Indo-Europeanization" of Europe was essentially a cultural, not a physical transformation. It is understood as a migration of Yamnaya people to Europe, as military victors, successfully imposing a new administrative system, language and religion upon the indigenous groups, who are referred to by Gimbutas as Old Europeans. (Note: According to Gimbutas, these indigenous groups existed for nearly three millennia (c. 6500–3500 BCE, during the Neolithic, Chalcolithic and Copper ages), consisting notably of the Narva, Funnelbeaker, Linear Pottery, Cardium pottery, Vinča, early Helladic, Minoan cultures etc. As a "truncation" of these cultures Gimbutas perceived (1) the "abrupt absences" of certain traditions of urbanism, pottery and visual arts as well as in "symbols and script" as well as (2) the "equally abrupt appearance of thrusting weapons and horses infiltrating the Danubian Valley and other major grasslands of the Balkans and Central Europe", initiating "a dramatic shift in the prehistory of Europe, a change in social structure and in residence patterns, in art and in religion" which was to be "a decisive factor in the formation of Europe's last 5,000 years.") The Yamnaya people's social organization, especially a patrilinear and patriarchal structure, greatly facilitated their effectiveness in war. According to Gimbutas, the social structure of Old Europe "contrasted with the Indo-European Kurgans who were mobile and non-egalitarian" and who had a hierarchically organised tripartite social structure; the IE were warlike, lived in smaller villages at times, and had an ideology that centered on the virile male, reflected also in their pantheon. In contrast, the indigenous groups of Old Europe had neither a warrior class nor horses. (Note: Old Europeans were sedentary-horticulturalist, living in "large agglomerations" – probably part of theocratic monarchies presided over by a queen-priestess – and had an ideology which "focused on the eternal aspects of birth, death, and regeneration, symbolized by the feminine principle, a mother creatrix"; they buried their dead in communal megalith graves and were generally peaceful.)

Indo-European languages probably spread through language shifts. Small groups can change a larger cultural area, and elite male dominance by small groups may have led to a language shift in northern India.

It is thought that when Indo-Europeans expanded into Europe from the Pontic-Caspian steppe, they encountered existing populations that spoke dissimilar, unrelated languages. Based on evidence from presumably non-Indo-European lexicon in the European branches of Indo-European, Iversen and Kroonen (2017) postulate a group of "Early European Neolithic" languages that is associated with the Neolithic spread of agriculturalists into Europe. Early European Neolithic languages were supplanted with the arrival of Indo-Europeans, but according to Iversen and Kroonen left their trace in a layer of mostly agricultural vocabulary in the Indo-European languages of Europe.

According to Edgar Polomé, 30% of modern German derives from a non-Indo-European sub-stratum language spoken by people of the Funnelbeaker culture indigenous to southern Scandinavia. When Yamnaya Indo-European speakers came into contact with the indigenous peoples during the third millennium BCE, they came to dominate the local populations, yet parts of the indigenous lexicon persisted in the formation of Proto-Germanic, thus lending to the Germanic languages the status of Indo-Europeanized languages. Similarly, according to Gimbutas, the Corded Ware culture, after migrating to Scandinavia, synthesized with the Funnelbeaker culture, giving birth to the Proto-Germanic language.

David Anthony, in his "revised Steppe hypothesis", conjectures that the spread of the Indo-European languages probably did not happen through "chain-type folk migrations", but by the introduction of these languages by ritual and political elites, which were emulated by large groups of people, (Note: David Anthony (1995): "Language shift can be understood best as a social strategy through which individuals and groups compete for positions of prestige, power, and domestic security [...] What is important, then, is not just dominance, but vertical social mobility and a linkage between language and access to positions of prestige and power [...] A relatively small immigrant elite population can encourage widespread language shift among numerically dominant indigenes in a non-state or pre-state context if the elite employs a specific combination of encouragements and punishments. Ethnohistorical cases [...] demonstrate that small elite groups have successfully imposed their languages in non-state situations.") a process which he calls "elite recruitment".

According to Parpola, local elites joined "small but powerful groups" of Indo-European-speaking migrants. These migrants had an attractive social system and good weapons, and luxury goods which marked their status and power. Joining these groups was attractive for local leaders, since it strengthened their position, and gave them additional advantages. These new members were further incorporated by matrimonial alliances.

According to Joseph Salmons, language shift is facilitated by "dislocation" of language communities, in which the elite is taken over. He observes that this change is facilitated by "systematic changes in community structure", in which a local community becomes incorporated in a larger social structure. (Note: Note the dislocation of the Indus Valley Civilisation prior to the start of the Indo-Aryan migrations into northern India, and the onset of Sanskritisation with the rise of the Kuru kingdom, as described by Michael Witzel. The "Ancestral North Indians" and "Ancestral South Indians" (Note: Reich et al. 2009, Reconstructing Indian Population History.) mixed between 4,200 and 1,900 years ago (2200 BCE – 100 CE), where after a shift to endogamy took place.)

=== Genetics ===
Since the 2000s, genetic studies have been assuming a prominent role in the research on Indo-European migrations. Whole-genome studies reveal relations between the people associated with various cultures and the time-range in which those relations were established. Research by Haak et al. (2015) showed that ~75% of the ancestry of Corded Ware-related people came from Yamna-related populations, while Allentoft et al. (2015) shows that the people of the Sintashta culture are genetically related to those of the Corded Ware culture.

=== Ecological studies ===
Climate change and drought may have triggered both the initial dispersal of Indo-European speakers, and the migration of Indo-Europeans from the steppes in south central Asia and India.

Around 4200–4100 BCE a climate change occurred, manifesting in colder winters in Europe. Steppe herders, archaic Proto-Indo-European speakers, spread into the lower Danube valley about 4200–4000 BCE, either causing or taking advantage of the collapse of Old Europe.

The Yamnaya horizon was an adaptation to a climate change that occurred between 3500 and 3000 BCE, in which the steppes became drier and cooler. Herds needed to be moved frequently to feed them sufficiently, and the use of wagons and horse riding made this possible, leading to "a new, more mobile form of pastoralism".

In the second millennium BCE widespread aridization led to water shortages and ecological changes in both the Eurasian steppes and south Asia. (Note: Rajesh Kochhar (2017), "The Aryan chromosome", The Indian Express.) At the steppes, humidization led to a change of vegetation, triggering "higher mobility and transition to the nomadic cattle breeding". (Note: Demkina et al. (2017): "In the second millennium BC, humidization of the climate led to the divergence of the soil cover with secondary formation of the complexes of chestnut soils and solonetzes. This paleoecological crisis had a significant effect on the economy of the tribes in the Late Catacomb and Post-Catacomb time stipulating their higher mobility and transition to the nomadic cattle breeding.") (Note: See also Eurogenes Blog, The crisis.) Water shortage also had a strong impact in south Asia, "causing the collapse of sedentary urban cultures in south central Asia, Afghanistan, Iran, and India, and triggering large-scale migrations".

== Origins of the Indo-Europeans ==
The Proto-Indo-European homeland according to the Kurgan hypothesis (dark green) and the present-day distribution of Indo-European languages in Eurasia (light green)

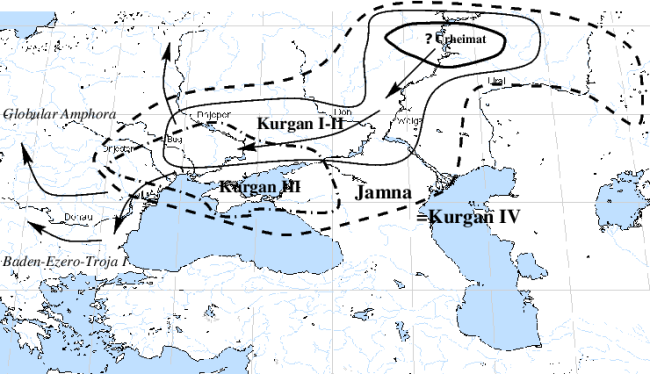
The development of the Kurgan culture according to Marija Gimbutas' Kurgan hypothesis

=== Proto-Indo-Europeans ===
The Proto-Indo-Europeans were the speakers of the Proto-Indo-European language (PIE), a reconstructed prehistoric language of Eurasia. Knowledge of them comes chiefly from the linguistic reconstruction, along with material evidence from archaeology and archaeogenetics.

==== Characteristics ====
According to some archaeologists, PIE speakers cannot be assumed to have been a single, identifiable people or tribe, but were a group of loosely related populations ancestral to the later, still partially prehistoric, Bronze Age Indo-Europeans. This view is held especially by those archaeologists who posit an original homeland of vast extent and immense time depth. However, this view is not shared by linguists, as proto-languages generally occupy small geographical areas over a very limited time span, and are generally spoken by close-knit communities such as a single small tribe.

The Proto-Indo-Europeans were likely to have lived during the late Neolithic, or roughly the 4th millennium BCE. Mainstream scholarship places them in the forest-steppe zone immediately to the north of the western end of the Pontic–Caspian steppe in Eastern Europe. Some archaeologists would extend the time depth of PIE to the middle Neolithic (5500 to 4500 BCE) or even the early Neolithic (7500 to 5500 BCE), and suggest alternative Proto-Indo-European original homelands.

By the late third millennium BCE, offshoots of the Proto-Indo-Europeans had reached Anatolia (Hittites), the Aegean (Mycenaean Greece), Western Europe, and southern Siberia (Afanasevo culture).

==== Genetic origins of the Proto-Indo-Europeans ====
The proto-Indo-Europeans, i.e. the Yamnaya people and the related cultures, seem to have been a mix from Eastern European hunter-gatherers; and people related to the Near East, i.e. Caucasus hunter-gatherers (CHG) i.e. Iran Chalcolithic people with a Caucasian hunter-gatherer component. Where this CHG-component came from is unknown; the mix of EHG and CHG may result from "an existing natural genetic gradient running from EHG far to the north to CHG/Iran in the south," or it may be explained as "the result of Iranian/CHG-related ancestry reaching the steppe zone independently and prior to a stream of AF [Anatolian Farmer] ancestry," reaching the steppes with people who migrated northwards into the steppes between 5,000 and 3,000 BCE. (Note: According to Haak et al. (2015), "the Yamnaya steppe herders of this time were descended not only from the preceding eastern European hunter-gatherers, but from a population of Near Eastern ancestry." According to Jones et al. (2016), Caucasus hunter-gatherers "genomes significantly contributed to the Yamnaya steppe herders who migrated into Europe ~3,000 BCE, supporting a formative Caucasus influence on this important Early Bronze Age culture. CHG left their imprint on modern populations from the Caucasus and also central and south Asia possibly marking the arrival of Indo-Aryan languages." (Note: Jones et al. (2016) further note that "Caucasus hunter-gatherers (CHG) belong to a distinct ancient clade that split from western hunter-gatherers ~45 kya, shortly after the expansion of anatomically modern humans into Europe and from the ancestors of Neolithic farmers ~25 kya, around the Last Glacial Maximum.") According to Lazaridis et al. (2016), "a population related to the people of the Iran Chalcolithic contributed ~ 43 % of the ancestry of early Bronze Age populations of the steppe." These Iranian Chacolithic people were a mixture of "the Neolithic people of western Iran, the Levant, and Caucasus Hunter Gatherers". Lazaridis et al. (2016), referring to Haak et al. (2015): "The spread of Near Eastern ancestry into the Eurasian steppe was previously inferred without access to ancient samples, by hypothesizing a population related to present-day Armenians as a source." Eurogenes Blog: "Lazaridis et al. show that Early to Middle Bronze Age steppe groups, including Yamnaya, tagged by them as Steppe EMBA, are best modeled with formal statistics as a mixture of Eastern European Hunter-Gatherers (EHG) and Chalcolithic farmers from western Iran. The mixture ratios are 56.8/43.2, respectively. However, they add that a model of Steppe EMBA as a three-way mixture between EHG, the Chalcolithic farmers and Caucasus Hunter-Gatherers (CHG) is also a good fit and plausible." (Note: Eurogenes Blog, The genetic structure of the world's first farmers (Lazaridis et al. preprint)) See also: For what they were... we are (2016) Ancient genomes from Neolithic West Asia; Stephanie Dutchen (2014), New Branch Added to European Family Tree. Genetic analysis reveals Europeans descended from at least three ancient groups; Dieneke's Anthropology Blog, West Asian in the flesh (hunter-gatherers from Georgia) (Jones et al. 2016); For what they were... we are (2016), Caucasus and Swiss hunter-gatherer genomes.)

=== Urheimat (original homeland) ===
The Proto-Indo-European Urheimat hypotheses are tentative identifications of the Urheimat, or primary homeland, of the hypothetical Proto-Indo-European language. Such identifications attempt to be consistent with the glottochronology of the language tree and with the archaeology of those places and times. Identifications are made on the basis of how well, if at all, the projected migration routes and times of migration fit the distribution of Indo-European languages, and how closely the sociological model of the original society reconstructed from Proto-Indo-European lexical items fits the archaeological profile. All hypotheses assume a significant period (at least 1500–2000 years) between the time of the Proto-Indo-European language and the earliest attested texts, at Kültepe, c. 19th century BCE.

Different possibilities exist regarding the genesis of archaic PIE. While the consensus is that early and late PIE languages originated on the Pontic steppes, the location of the origin of archaic PIE has become the focus of renewed attention, due to the question where the CHG-component came from, and if they were the carriers of archaic PIE. The most widely accepted hypothesis is the Steppe hypothesis, which puts the archaic, early, and late PIE homeland in the Pontic–Caspian steppe between ca. 4400 and 3400 BCE, with Lazaridis and Anthony proposing the Caucasus-lower Volga area as the region where archaic PIE originated ca. 4400-4000 BCE. The "mostly abandoned" Anatolian hypothesis places the homeland in Anatolia c. 8000 BCE, and suggests that the Indo-European languages spread with farming. A third group of proposals suggest an archaic PIE-homeland south of the caucasus. (Note: Mallory, Dybo & Balanovsky (2020): "[G]enetics has pushed the current homeland debate into several camps: those who seek the homeland either in the southern Caucasus or Iran (CHG) and those who locate it in the steppelands north of the Caucasus and Caspian Sea (EHG).") (Note: The following suggestions have been made from 2015 to 2019: Haak et al. (2015) state that "the Armenian plateau hypothesis gains in plausibility" given the Near Eastern ancestry in Yamnaya, but also state that "the question of what languages were spoken" by the ancestral steppe hunter-gatherers and the southern ancestors "remains open" (Haak et al. 2015a, p. 138). According to Haak et al. (2015), "both south-north and north-south genetic influence across the Caucasus is plausible" (Haak et al. 2015a, p. 138).; According to Damgaard et al. (2018), between 5,000 and 3,000 BCE, during the Copper Age, there was "extensive population contact between the Caucasus and the steppe". (Damgaard 2018) The typical steppe ancestry probably developed during this time (Damgaard 2018). Damgaard et al. (2018) notice that they "cannot at this point reject a scenario in which the introduction of the Anatolian IE languages into Anatolia was coupled with the CHG-derived admixture before 3700 BCE," but also state that "this is contrary to the standard view that PIE arose in the steppe north of the Caucasus and that CHG ancestry is also associated with several non-IE-speaking groups, historical and current" (Damgaard 2018).; Kristian Kristiansen, in an interview with Der Spiegel in May 2018, stated that the Yamnaya culture may have had a predecessor at the Caucasus, where "proto-proto-Indo-European" was spoken (Grolle 2018, p. 108). In 2020 he argued that the Maykop-culture may have been the bearer op pre-PIE (Kristiansen 2020).; David Reich has repeatedly suggested the possibility of a Caucasian origin of archaic PIE (Mathieson 2018, pp. line 363–382, Reich 2018, p. 120) but does not exclude the possibility of a steppe origin of the Anatolian languages (Mathieson 2018, pp. line 380–382). Noting the absence in the Anatolian languages of the "full wagon and wheel vocabulary" found in all present-day IE-languages, and the absence of steppe-ancestry in Anatolian DNA from this time, Reich states that "this suggests to me that the most likely location of the population that first spoke an Indo-European language was south of the Caucasus Mountains, perhaps in present-day Iran or Armenia, because ancient DNA from people who lived there matches what we would expect for a source population both for the Yamnaya and for ancient Anatolians." Yet, Reich also notes that "...the evidence here is circumstantial as no ancient DNA from the Hittites themselves has yet been published" (Reich 2018, p. 120) and the possibility of a steppe origin of the Anatolian languages also cannot be excluded (Mathieson 2018, pp. line 380–382). According to Reich, between 5,000 and 3,000 BCE the CHG-carriers, people related to Armenians and Iranians, migrated from the south to the steppes and encountered local Eastern European hunter-gatherers (EHG peoples) (Reich 2018, pp. 109–110).; Wang et al. (2018) note that the Caucasus served as a corridor for gene flow between the steppe and cultures south of the Caucasus during the Eneolithic and the Bronze Age, stating that this "opens up the possibility of a homeland of PIE south of the Caucasus." However, Wang et al. also acknowledge that the latest genetic evidence supports an origin of proto-Indo-Europeans in the steppe (Wang et al. 2018, p. 15). Wang et al. (2018): "but the latest ancient DNA results from South Asia also lend weight to a spread of Indo-European languages via the steppe belt. The spread of some or all of the proto-Indo-European branches would have been possible via the North Caucasus and Pontic region and from there, along with pastoralist expansions, to the heart of Europe. This scenario finds support from the well attested and now widely documented 'steppe ancestry' in European populations, the postulate of increasingly patrilinear societies in the wake of these expansions (exemplified by R1a/R1b), as attested in the latest study on the Bell Beaker phenomenon" (Wang et al. 2018, p. 15).) This includes the Armenian hypothesis, which situates the homeland for archaic PIE ('Indo-Hittite') south of the Caucasus mountains, This hypothesis has gained renewed attention during the 2010s and 2020s due to aDNA research, which has resulted in various proposals for an archaic 'Indo-Anatolian' or 'Indo-Hittite' homeland in or south of the Caucasus. Lazaridis and Anthony propose an intermediate solution, suggesting an archaic Proto-Indo-European homeland, which spawned proto-Indo-Anatolian, between the Lower Volga and the Caucasus, as suggested by Lazaridis et al. (2025).

==== The Kurgan hypothesis and the "revised steppe hypothesis" ====
Since the early 1980s, the mainstream consensus among Indo-Europeanists favors Marija Gimbutas's "Kurgan hypothesis", or, more lately, David Anthony's "revised Steppe hypothesis", derived from Gimbutas's pioneering work, placing the Indo-European homeland in the Pontic steppe, more specifically, between the Dniepr (Ukraine) and the Ural river (Russia), of the Chalcolithic period (4th to 5th millennia BCE), where various related cultures developed.

The Pontic steppe is a large area of grasslands in far Eastern Europe, located north of the Black Sea, Caucasus Mountains and Caspian Sea and including parts of eastern Ukraine, southern Russia and northwest Kazakhstan. This is the time and place of the earliest domestication of the horse, which according to this hypothesis was the work of early Indo-Europeans, allowing them to expand outwards and assimilate or conquer many other cultures.

The Kurgan hypothesis (also called a theory or model) argues that the people of an archaeological "Kurgan culture" (a term grouping the Yamnaya or Pit Grave culture and its predecessors and successor in the Pontic steppe from the 6th to late 4th millennia BCE) were the most likely speakers of the Proto-Indo-European language. The term is derived from kurgan (курган), a Turkic loanword in Russian for a tumulus or burial mound. An origin at the Pontic-Caspian steppes is the most widely accepted scenario of Indo-European origins. (Note: Mallory: "The Kurgan solution is attractive and has been accepted by many archaeologists and linguists, in part or total. It is the solution one encounters in the Encyclopædia Britannica and the Grand Dictionnaire Encyclopédique Larousse." Strazny: "The single most popular proposal is the Pontic steppes (see the Kurgan hypothesis) ....")

Marija Gimbutas formulated her Kurgan hypothesis in the 1950s, grouping together a number of related cultures at the Pontic steppes. She defined the "Kurgan culture" as composed of four successive periods, with the earliest (Kurgan I) including the Samara and Seroglazovo cultures of the Dnieper/Volga region in the Copper Age (early 4th millennium BCE). The bearers of these cultures were nomadic pastoralists, who, according to the model, by the early 3rd millennium expanded throughout the Pontic–Caspian steppe and into Eastern Europe.

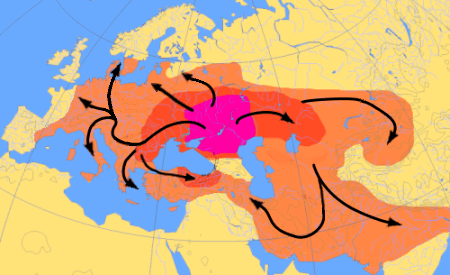
Scheme of Indo-European migrations from c. 4000 to 1000 BCE according to the Kurgan hypothesis. These migrations are thought to have spread WSH ancestry and Indo-European languages throughout large parts of Eurasia.

Gimbutas's grouping is nowadays considered to have been too broad. According to Anthony, it is better to speak of the Yamnaya culture or of a "Yamnaya horizon", which included several related cultures, as the defining Proto-Indo-European culture at the Pontic steppe. David Anthony has incorporated recent developments in his "revised steppe hypothesis", which also supports a steppe origin of the Indo-European languages. Anthony emphasizes the Yamnaya culture (3300–2500 BCE), which according to him started on the middle Don and Volga, as the origin of the Indo-European dispersal, but regards Khvalynsk archaeological culture since around 4500 BCE as the oldest phase of Proto-Indo-European in the lower and middle Volga, a culture that kept domesticated sheep, goats, cattle and maybe horses. Recent research by Haak et al. (2015) confirms the migration of Yamnaya-people into western Europe, forming the Corded Ware culture.

==== Anatolian hypothesis ====
The primary competitor was the Anatolian hypothesis advanced by Colin Renfrew, which states that the Indo-European languages began to spread peacefully into Europe from Asia Minor (modern Turkey) from around 7000 BCE with the Neolithic Revolution's advance of farming by demic diffusion (spread via migration). Accordingly, most of the inhabitants of Neolithic Europe would have spoken Indo-European languages, and later migrations would at best have replaced these Indo-European varieties with other Indo-European varieties. The main strength of the farming hypothesis lies in its linking of the spread of Indo-European languages with an archaeologically known event (the spread of farming) that is often assumed as involving significant population shifts. Nevertheless, these days the Anatolian hypothesis is generally rejected, since it is incompatible with the growing data on the genetic history of the Yamnaya people.

==== Caucasian proposals ====
===== Armenian hypothesis =====
Another hypothesis which has drawn considerable, and renewed, attention is the Armenian plateau hypothesis of Gamkrelidze and Ivanov, who have argued that the Urheimat was south of the Caucasus, specifically, "within eastern Anatolia, the southern Caucasus and northern Mesopotamia" in the fifth to fourth millennia BCE. Their proposal was based on a disputed hypothesis of glottal consonants in PIE. According to Gamkrelidze and Ivanov, PIE words for material-culture objects imply contact with more advanced peoples to the south, the existence of Semitic loan-words in PIE, Kartvelian borrowings from PIE, and some contact with Sumerian, Elamite, and others. However, given that the glottalic hypothesis never caught on and there was little archaeological support for it, the Gamkrelidze and Ivanov hypothesis did not gain support until Renfrew's Anatolian hypothesis revived aspects of their proposal.

==== South Caucasian/Iranian origins ====
Some recent DNA-research has led to renewed suggestions, most notably by David Reich, of a Caucasian, or even Iranian, homeland for archaic or 'proto-proto-Indo-European', from where archaic PIE speaking people migrated into Anatolia, where the Anatolian languages developed, while at the steppes archaic PIE developed into early and late PIE.

Anthony (2019, 2020) criticizes the Southern/Caucasian origin proposals of Reich and Kristiansen, and rejects the possibility that the Bronze Age Maykop people of the Caucasus were a southern source of language and genetics of Indo-European. According to Anthony, referring to Wang et al. (2018), (Note: See also Bruce Bower (February 8, 2019), DNA reveals early mating between Asian herders and European farmers, ScienceNews.) the Maykop-culture had little genetic impact on the Yamnaya, whose paternal lineages were found to differ from those found in Maykop remains, but were instead related to those of earlier Eastern European hunter-gatherers. Also, the Maykop (and other contemporary Caucasus samples), along with CHG from this date, had significant Anatolian Farmer ancestry "which had spread into the Caucasus from the west after about 5000 BC", while the Yamnaya had a lower percentage which does not fit with a Maykop origin. Partly for these reasons, Anthony concludes that Bronze Age Caucasus groups such as the Maykop "played only a minor role, if any, in the formation of Yamnaya ancestry." According to Anthony, the roots of Proto-Indo-European (archaic or proto-proto-Indo-European) were mainly in the steppe rather than the south. Anthony considers it likely that the Maykop spoke a Northern Caucasian language not ancestral to Indo-European.

==== Bomhard's hybrid North Caspian/Caucasian hypothesis ====
Bomhard's alternative Caucasian substrate hypothesis proposes a "north-Caspian Indo-Uralic" Urheimat, involving an origin of PIE from the contact of two languages; a Eurasian steppe language from the north Caspian (related to Uralic) which acquired a substratal influence from a northwest Caucasian language. (Note: Allan R. Bomhard has elaborated upon Kortlandt's ideas. According to Allan R. Bomhard, "Proto-Indo-European is the result of the imposition of a Eurasiatic language – to use Greenberg's term – on a population speaking one or more primordial Northwest Caucasian languages." Anthony states that the validity of such deep relationships cannot be reliably demonstrated due to the time-depth involved, and also notes that the similarities may be explained by borrowings from PIE into Proto-Uralic. Yet, Anthony also notes that the North Caucasian communities "were southern participants in the steppe world".) According to Anthony (2019), a genetic relationship to Uralic is unlikely and cannot be reliably proven; similarities between Uralic and Indo-European would be explained by early borrowings and influence.

Several proposals have also been made of east-Caspian influences, or an east-Caspian Indo-European or Indo-Uralic homeland. (Note: East-Caspian proposals and influences: Soviet and post-Soviet Russian archaeologists have proposed an East Caspian influence, via the eastern Caspian areas, on the formation of the Don-Volga cultures (Vybornov 2016, p. 164). See also Ancient DNA Era (11 January 2019), How did CHG get into Steppe_EMBA ? Part 2 : The Pottery Neolithic; The "Sogdiana hypothesis" of Johanna Nichols places the homeland in the fourth or fifth millennium BCE to the east of the Caspian Sea, in the area of ancient Bactria-Sogdiana (Nichols (1997), Nichols (1999)) From there, PIE spread north to the steppes, and south-west towards Anatolia (Kozintsev 2019, p. 337) Nichols eventually rejected her theory, finding it incompatible with the linguistic and archaeological data (Kozintsev 2019, p. 337).; Following Nichols' initial proposal, Kozintsev has argued for an Indo-Uralic homeland east of the Caspian Sea (Kozintsev 2019). From this homeland, Indo-Uralic PIE-speakers migrated south-west, and split in the southern Caucasus, forming the Anatolian and steppe languages at their respective locations (Kozintsev 2019).; Bernard Sergent has elaborated on the idea of east Caspian influences on the formation of the Volga culture, arguing for a PIE homeland in the east Caspian territory, from where it migrated north. Sergent notes that the lithic assemblage of the first Kurgan culture in Ukraine (Sredni Stog II), which originated from the Volga and South Urals, recalls that of the Mesolithic–Neolithic sites to the east of the Caspian sea, Dam Dam Chesme II and the cave of Djebel (Sergent 1995, Yet, Sergent places the earliest roots of Gimbutas' Kurgan cradle of Indo-Europeans in an even more southern cradle, and adds that the Djebel material is related to a Paleolithic material of Northwestern Iran, the Zarzian culture, dated 10,000–8,500 BCE, and in the more ancient Kebarian of the Near East. He concludes that more than 10,000 years ago the Indo-Europeans were a small people grammatically, phonetically and lexically close to Semitic–Hamitic populations of the Near East (Sergent 1995).)

==== Caucasus-lower Volga steppe proposal for archaic PIE ====
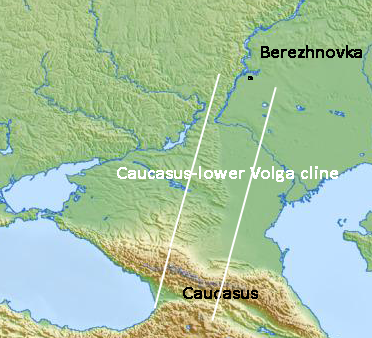
Cacasus-lower Volga cline, after Lazaridis et al. (2025), "Genetic origin of the indo-Europeans".

A recent analysis by Anthony (2019, 2020) suggests a genetic origin of proto-Indo-Europeans (of the Yamnaya culture) at the plains of the lower Volga north of the Caucasus, deriving from a mixture of Eastern European hunter-gatherers (EHGs) and Caucasus hunter-gatherers (CHGs). Anthony argues that the Proto-Indo-European language formed mainly from a base of languages spoken by Eastern European hunter-gatherers, with some influences from languages of northern Caucasus hunter-gatherers, who migrated from the Caucasus to the lower Volga. Additionally, there is possible later, and minor, influence from the language of the Maykop culture to the south (which is hypothesized to have belonged to the North Caucasian family) in the later Neolithic or Bronze Age involving little genetic impact.

According to Anthony, hunting-fishing camps from the lower Volga, dated 6200–4500 BCE, could be the remains of people who contributed the CHG-component, similar to the Hotu cave, migrating from northwestern Iran or Azerbaijan via the western Caspian coast. They mixed with EHG-people from the northern Volga steppes, forming the Khvalynsk culture, which "might represent the oldest phase of PIE.". The resulting culture contributed to the Sredny Stog culture, a predecessor of the Yamnaya culture.

While Lazaridis et al. (2022) situate proto-Indo-Anatolian in the Caucasus proper, Lazaridis et al. (2025), co-author David Anthony, suggest a Caucasus-lower Volga cline between the Caucasus and Berezhnovka at the lower Volga, of people with a spectrum of mixed EHG and CHG ancestry, speaking "proto-Indo-Anatolian", "the language ancestral to both Anatolian and Indo-European people, occur[ing] in CLV people some time between 4400 and 4000 BCE".

== Pre-Indo-European steppe-cultures ==
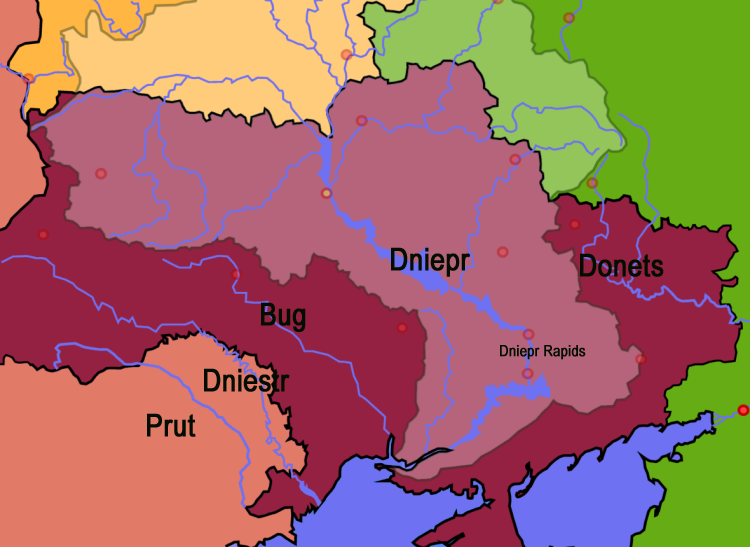
Ukrainian rivers

According to Anthony, the development of the Proto-Indo-European cultures into pastoral cultures started with the introduction of cattle at the Pontic-Caspian steppes. Until ca. 5200–5000 BCE the Pontic-Caspian steppes were populated by hunter-gatherers. According to Anthony, the first cattle herders arrived from the Danube Valley at ca. 5800–5700 BCE, descendants from the first European farmers. They formed the Criş culture (5800–5300 BCE), creating a cultural frontier at the Prut-Dniestr watershed. The adjacent Bug–Dniester culture (6300–5500 BCE) was a local culture, from where cattle breeding spread to the steppe peoples. The Dniepr Rapids area was the next part of the Pontic-Caspian steppes to shift to cattle-herding. It was the densely populated area of the Pontic-Caspian steppes at the time, and had been inhabited by various hunter-gatherer populations since the end of the Ice Age. From ca.5800–5200 it was inhabited by the first phase of the Dnieper–Donets culture, a hunter-gatherer culture contemporaneous with the Bug-Dniestr culture.

At ca. 5200–5000 BCE the Cucuteni–Trypillia culture (6000–3500 BCE) (aka Tripolye culture), presumed to be non-Indo-European speaking, appears east of the Carpathian Mountains, moving the cultural frontier to the Southern Bug valley, while the foragers at the Dniepr Rapids shifted to cattle herding, marking the shift to Dniepr-Donets II (5200/5000 – 4400/4200 BCE). The Dniepr-Donets culture kept cattle not only for ritual sacrifices, but also for their daily diet.

The proto-IE Khvalynsk culture (4700–3800 BCE), located at the middle Volga, which was connected with the Danube Valley by trade networks, had cattle and sheep, but they were "more important in ritual sacrifices than in the diet". The Samara culture (early 5th millennium BCE), (Note: There are several datings available: Gimbutas dated it to 5000 BCE.; According to V.A.Dergachev (2007), О скипетрах, о лошадях, о войне: Этюды в защиту миграционной концепции М. Гимбутас, ISBN 5-98187-173-3, dates Samara culture at cal. C-14 5200–4500 BCE, with possible continuatation into first half of 5th millennium, while the Khvalynsk culture is dated at ca. 4600–3900 BCE. These data are based on synchronisation, not radicarbon dating or dendrochronology of Samara culture sites itself.; Mallory and Adams, Encyclopedia of Indo-European culture, gives the bare date "fifth millennium BC", while the Khvalynsk culture, its reported successor, is dated at 4900–3500 BCE.) north of the Khvalynsk culture, interacted with the Khvalynsk culture, while the archaeological findings seem related to those of the Dniepr–Donets II culture.

== Archaic Proto-Indo-European - Anatolian ==
Archaic proto-IE, or "Indo-Anatolian", was the language from which the Anatolian languages split-off.

=== Caucasus-lower Volga origins ===
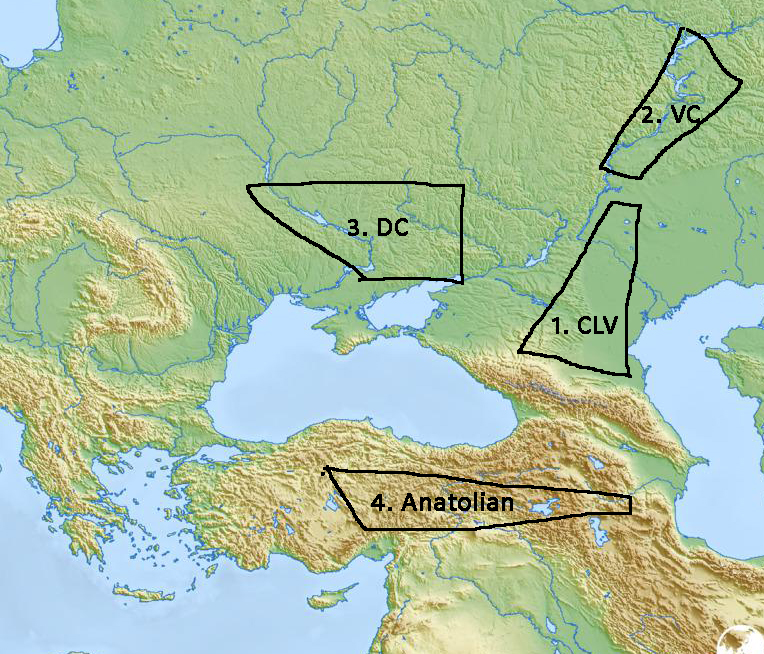
Four clines of the genetic origins of the Indo-European, according to Lazaridis and Anthony (2025): 1. Caucasus-lower Volga cline; 2. Volga cline; 3. Dnipr-cline; 4. Anatolians

According to Lazaridis and Anthony (2025), a "Caucasus-Lower Volga cline", containing a spectrum of mixed EHG and CHG ancestry, stretched from the Caucasus to Berezhnovka at the lower Volga, forming the urheimat for Indo-Anatolian ca. 4400-4000 BCE, the archaic proto-IE language from which the Anatolian languages split-off.

From this area, CLV-people migrated north up the Volga, further mixing with people with Eastern hunter-gatherer ancestry, forming the Volga-cline and creating the Khvalynsk culture.

CLV-people migrating west mixed with people with Ukrainian hunter-gatherer ancestry, forming the Dnipro-Don cline and creating the Serednii Stih (Sredny Stog) culture.

The Sredny Stog culture (4400–3300 BCE) appears at the same location as the Dnieper-Donets culture, but shows influences from people who came from the Volga river region. According to Vasiliev, the Khvalynsk and Sredny Stog cultures show strong similarities, suggesting "a broad Sredny Stog-Khvalynsk horizon embracing the entire Pontic-Caspian during the Eneolithic." From this horizon arose the Yamnaya culture, which also spread over the entire Pontic-Caspian steppe.

=== Anatolia: Archaic Proto-Indo-European (Hittites; 4500–3500 BCE) ===
The Hittite Empire at its greatest extent under Suppiluliuma I (c. 1350–1322 BCE) and Mursili II (c. 1321–1295 BCE)

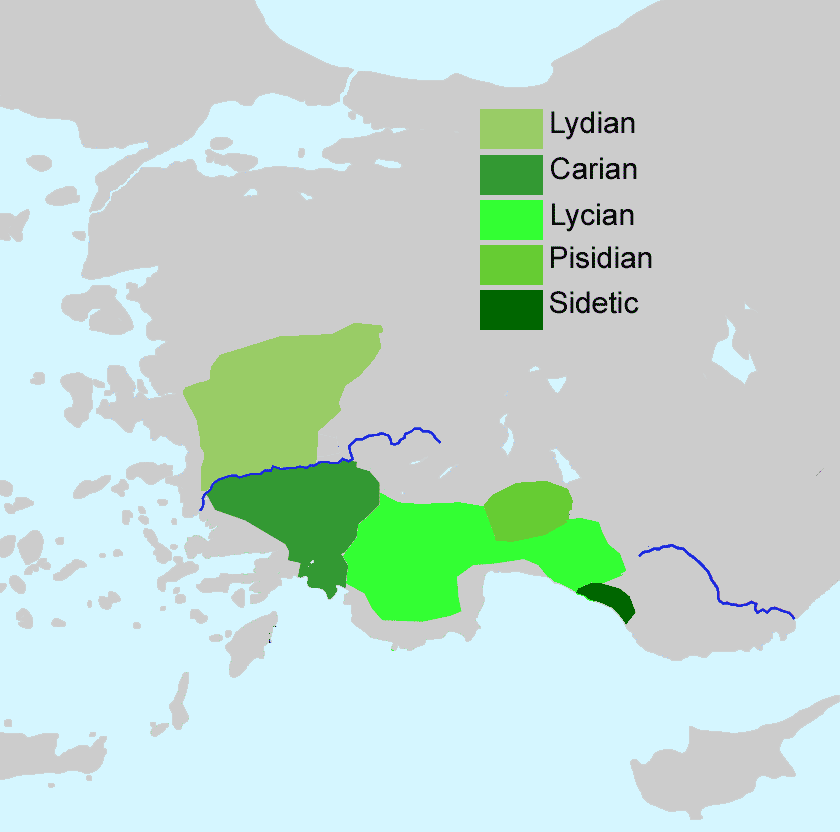
Anatolian languages attested in the mid-first millennium BCE

Area where the second millennium BCE Luwian language was spoken

The Anatolians were a group of distinct Indo-European peoples who spoke the Anatolian languages and shared a common culture. The Anatolians' earliest linguistic and historical attestation are as names mentioned in Assyrian mercantile texts from 19th-century BCE Kanesh.

The Anatolian languages were a branch of the larger Indo-European language family. The archaeological discovery of the archives of the Hittites and the classification of the Hittite language to a separate Anatolian branch of the Indo-European languages caused a sensation among historians, forcing a re-evaluation of Near Eastern history and Indo-European linguistics.

==== Origins ====
Damgaard et al. (2018) note that "[a]mong comparative linguists, a Balkan route for the introduction of Anatolian IE is generally considered more likely than a passage through the Caucasus, due, for example, to greater Anatolian IE presence and language diversity in the west."

Mathieson et al. (2018) note the absence of "large amounts" of steppe-ancestry in the Balkan peninsula and Anatolia, which may indicate that archaic PIE originated in the Caucasus or Iran, but also state that "it remains possible that Indo-European languages were spread through southeastern Europe into Anatolia without large-scale population movement or admixture."

Damgaard et al. (2018), found "no correlation between genetic ancestry and exclusive ethnic or political identities among the populations of Bronze Age Central Anatolia, as has previously been hypothesized." According to them, the Hittites lacked steppe-ancestry, arguing that "the Anatolian clade of IE languages did not derive from a large-scale Copper Age/Early Bronze Age population movement from the steppe," contrary Anthony's proposal of a large-scale migration via the Balkan as proposed in 2007. The first IE-speakers may have reached Anatolia "by way of commercial contacts and small-scale movement during the Bronze Age." They further state that their findings are "consistent with historical models of cultural hybridity and 'middle ground' in a multicultural and multilingual but genetically homogeneous Bronze Age Anatolia," as proposed by other researchers.

According to Kroonen et al. (2018), in the linguistic supplement to Damgaard et al. (2018), aDNA studies in Anatolia "show no indication of a large-scale intrusion of a steppe population", but do "fit the recently developed consensus among linguists and historians that the speakers of the Anatolian languages established themselves in Anatolia by gradual infiltration and cultural assimilation." They further note that this lends support to the Indo-Hittite hypothesis, according to which both proto-Anatolian and proto-Indo-European split-off from a common mother language "no later than the 4th millennium BCE."

Lazaridis and Anthony (2025) propose that archaic proto-Indo-European emerged ca. 4400-4000 BCE between the Caucasus and the lower Volga to the Caucasus' north, and reached Anatolia via the Caucasus.

==== Time-frame ====
Although the Hittites are first attested in the 2nd millennium BCE, the Anatolian branch seems to have separated at a very early stage from Proto-Indo-European, or may have developed from an older Pre-Proto-Indo-European ancestor. Considering a steppe origin for archaic PIE, together with the Tocharians the Anatolians constituted the first known dispersal of Indo-European out of the Eurasian steppe. Although those archaic PIE-speakers had wagons, they probably reached Anatolia before Indo-Europeans had learned to use chariots for war. It is likely that their arrival was one of gradual settlement and not as an invading army.

According to Mallory, it is likely that the Anatolians reached the Near East from the north, either via the Balkans or the Caucasus in the 3rd millennium BCE. According to Anthony, if it separated from Proto-Indo-European, it likely did so between 4500 and 3500 BCE. According to Anthony (2007), descendants of archaic Proto-Indo-European steppe herders, who moved into the lower Danube valley about 4200–4000 BCE, later moved into Anatolia, at an unknown time, but maybe as early as 3,000 BCE. According to Parpola, the appearance of Indo-European speakers from Europe into Anatolia, and the appearance of Hittite, is related to later migrations of Proto-Indo-European speakers from the Yamna-culture into the Danube Valley at c. 2800 BCE, which is in line with the "customary" assumption that the Anatolian Indo-European language was introduced into Anatolia somewhere in the third millennium BCE.

==== Hittite civilisation ====
The Hittites, who established an extensive empire in the Middle East in the 2nd millennium BCE, are by far the best-known members of the Anatolian group. The history of the Hittite civilization is known mostly from cuneiform texts found in the area of their kingdom, and from diplomatic and commercial correspondence found in various archives in Egypt and the Middle East. Despite the use of Hatti for their core territory, the Hittites should be distinguished from the Hattians, an earlier people who inhabited the same region (until the beginning of the 2nd millennium). The Hittite military made successful use of chariots. Although belonging to the Bronze Age, they were the forerunners of the Iron Age, developing the manufacture of iron artifacts from as early as the 14th century BCE, when letters to foreign rulers reveal the latter's demand for iron goods. The Hittite empire reached its height during the mid-14th century BCE under Suppiluliuma I, when it encompassed an area that included most of Asia Minor as well as parts of the northern Levant and Upper Mesopotamia. After 1180 BCE, amid the Bronze Age Collapse in the Levant associated with the sudden arrival of the Sea Peoples, the kingdom disintegrated into several independent "Neo-Hittite" city-states, some of which survived until as late as the 8th century BCE. The lands of the Anatolian peoples were successively invaded by a number of peoples and empires at high frequency: the Phrygians, Bithynians, the Medes, the Persians, the Greeks, the Galatian Celts, Romans and the Oghuz Turks. Many of these invaders settled in Anatolia, in some cases causing the extinction of the Anatolian languages. By the Middle Ages, all the Anatolian languages (and the cultures accompanying them) were extinct, although there may be lingering influences on the modern inhabitants of Anatolia, most notably Armenians.

=== Europe: migration into the Danube Valley - 'collapse of Old Europe' (4200 BCE) ===
According to Gimbutas' Kurgan hypothesis, Old Europe was invaded and destroyed by horse-riding pastoral nomads from the Pontic–Caspian steppe (the "Kurgan culture") who brought with them violence, patriarchy, and Indo-European languages, the 'collapse of Old Europe'.

According to Anthony (2007), Pre-Yamnaya steppe herders, archaic Proto-Indo-European speakers, spread into the lower Danube valley about 4200–4000 BCE, either causing or taking advantage of the collapse of Old Europe, their languages "probably included archaic Proto-Indo-European dialects of the kind partly preserved later in Anatolian." See Suvorovo culture and Ezero culture for details.

According to Anthony (2007), descendants of these archaic Proto-Indo-European steppe herders later moved into Anatolia, at an unknown time, but maybe as early as 3,000 BCE. Yet, Lazaridis and Anthony (2025) propose that archaic proto-Indo-European emerged ca. 4400-4000 BCE between the Caucasus and the lower Volga, and reached Anatolia via the Caucasus.

=== Northern Caucasus: The Maykop culture (3700–3000 BCE) ===
Geographic extent of the Maykop culture

The Maykop culture, c. 3700–3000 BCE, was a major Bronze Age archaeological culture in the Western Caucasus region of Southern Russia. It extends along the area from the Taman Peninsula at the Kerch Strait to near the modern border of Dagestan and southwards to the Kura River. The culture takes its name from a royal burial found in Maykop kurgan in the Kuban River valley.

According to Mallory and Adams (1997), migrations southward founded the Maykop culture (c. 3500–2500 BCE). Yet, according to Mariya Ivanova the Maykop origins were on the Iranian Plateau, while kurgans from the beginning of the 4th millennium at Soyuqbulaq in Azerbaijan, which belong to the Leyla-Tepe culture, show parallels with the Maykop kurgans. According to Museyibli, "the Leylatepe Culture tribes migrated to the north in the mid-fourth millennium and played an important part in the rise of the Maykop Culture of the North Caucasus." This model was confirmed by a genetic study published in 2018, which attributed the origin of Maykop individuals to a migration of Eneolithic farmers from western Georgia towards the north side of the Caucasus. It has been suggested that the Maykop people spoke a North Caucasian, rather than an Indo-European, language.

== Early Proto-Indo-European - Afanasievo ==
=== Afanasievo culture (3500–2500 BCE) ===
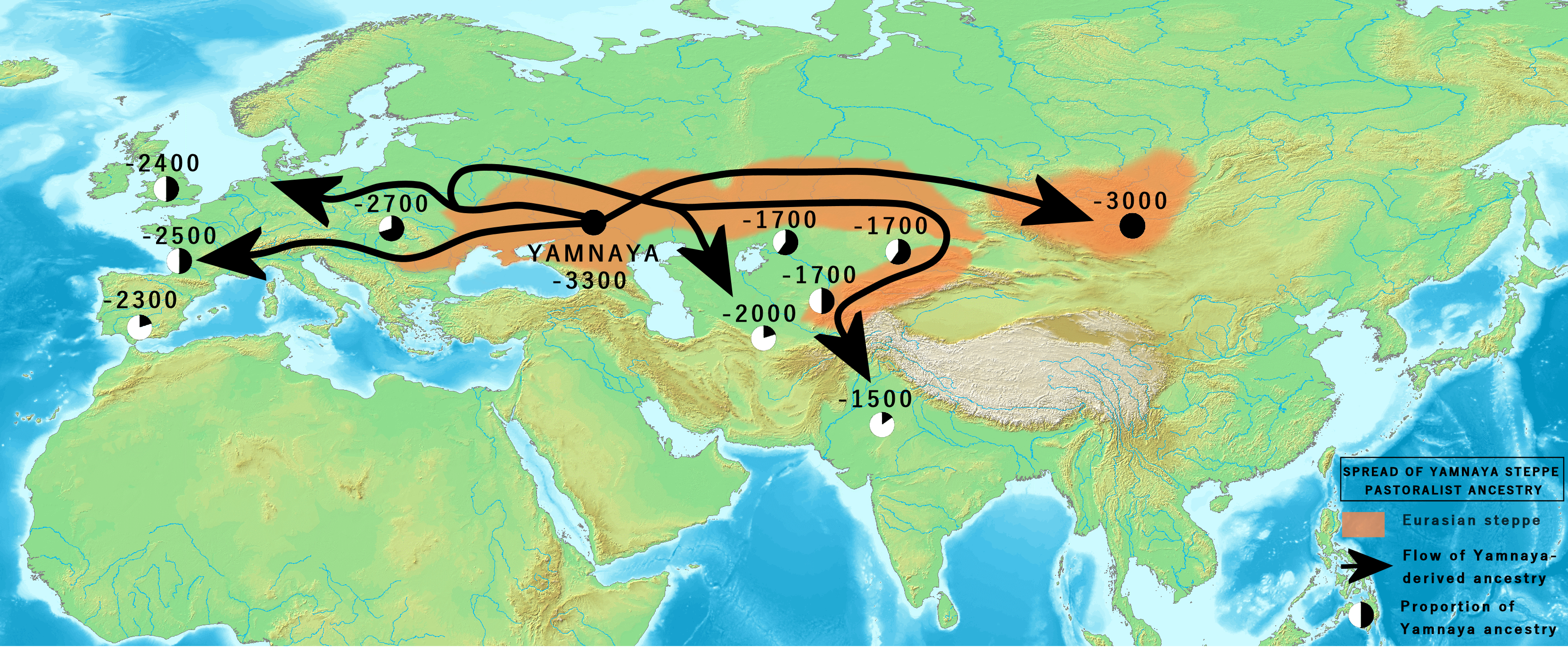
Bronze Age spread of Yamnaya Steppe pastoralist ancestry into two subcontinents—Europe and South Asia, and location of the Afanasievo culture, which has the same genetic characteristics as the Yamnayas.

According to Anthony (2007) migration of people from the pre-Yamnaya Repin culture (4th millennium BCE) at the Don river, gave rise to the Afanasievo culture (3300 to 2500 BCE), the earliest Eneolithic archaeological culture found until now in south Siberia, occupying the Minusinsk Basin, Altay and Eastern Kazakhstan. The Afanasievo culture is related to the Tocharians, while the Repin culture developed into the Yamnaya culture.

Radiocarbon gives dates as early as 3705 BCE on wooden tools and 2874 BCE on human remains for the Afanasievo culture. The earliest of these dates has now been rejected, giving a date of around 3300 BCE for the start of the culture.

=== The Tocharians ===
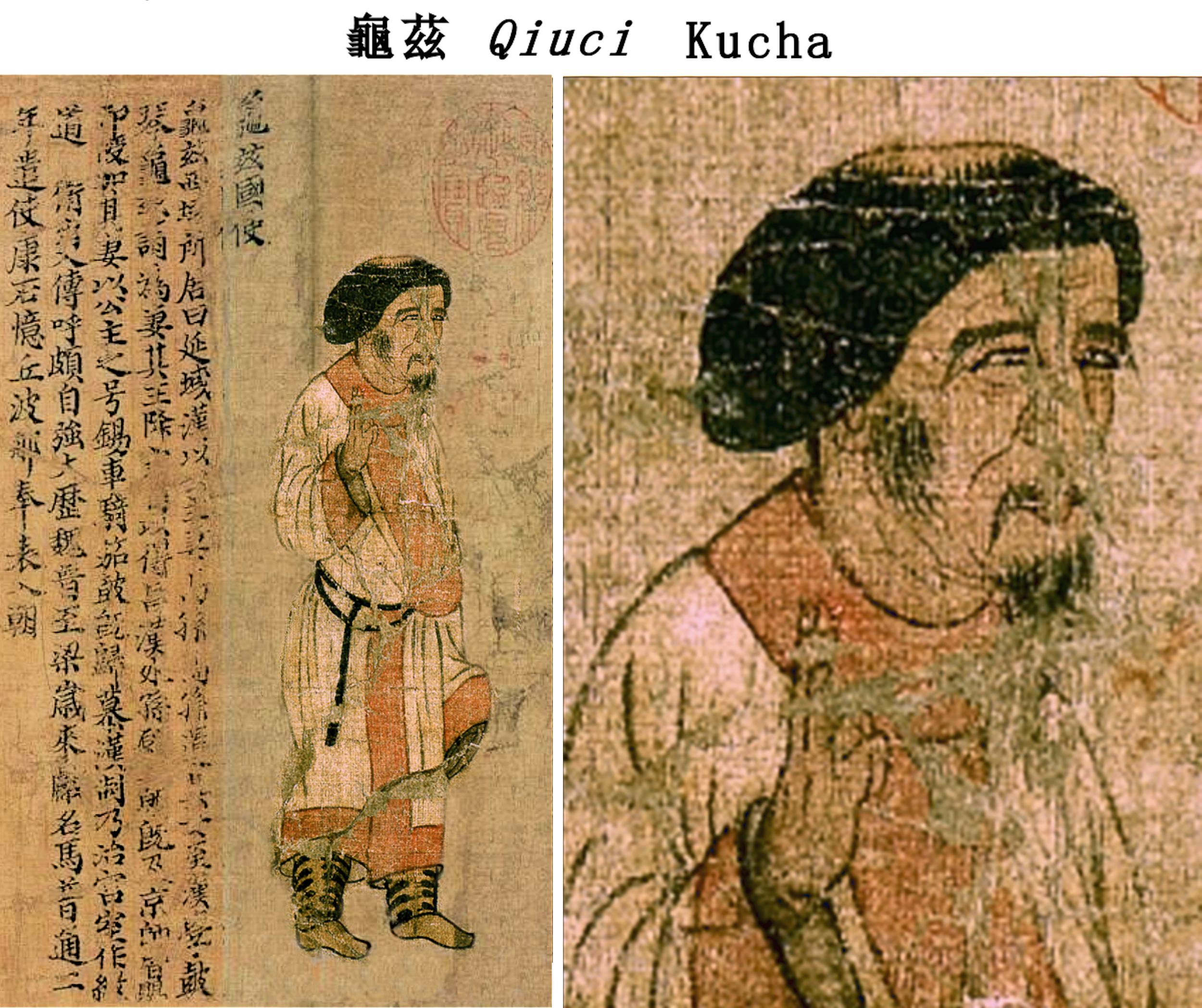
Ambassador from Kucha (龜茲國 Qiuci-guo), one of the main Tocharian cities, visiting the Chinese Southern Liang court in Jingzhou c. 516–520 CE, with explanatory text. Portraits of Periodical Offering of Liang, 11th century Song copy.

These movements of both Tocharians and Iranians into East Central Asia were not a mere footnote in the history of China but... were part of a much wider picture involving the very foundations of the world's oldest surviving civilization."

— J. P. Mallory & Victor H. Mair

The Tocharians, or "Tokharians" (/təˈkɛəriənz/ or /təˈkɑːriənz/) were inhabitants of medieval oasis city-states on the northern edge of the Tarim Basin (modern Xinjiang, China). Their Tocharian languages (a branch of the Indo-European family) are known from manuscripts from the 6th to 8th centuries CE, after which they were supplanted by the Turkic languages of the Uyghur tribes. These people were called "Tocharian" by late 19th-century scholars who identified them with the Tókharoi described by ancient Greek sources as inhabiting Bactria. Although this identification is now generally considered mistaken, the name has become customary.

The Tocharians are thought to have developed from the Afanasevo culture of Siberia (c. 3500–2500 BCE). It is believed that the Tarim mummies, dated from 1800 BCE, represent a migration of Tocharian speakers from the Afanasevo culture in the Tarim Basin in the early 2nd millennium BCE; however, a 2021 genetic study demonstrated the Tarim Mummies are remains of locals descending from Ancient North Eurasians and Northeast Asians, and instead suggested that "Tocharian may have been plausibly introduced to the Dzungarian Basin by Afanasievo migrants" -i.e. "the Afanasievo herders of the Altai–Sayan region in southern Siberia (3150–2750 BC), who in turn have close genetic ties with the Yamnaya (3500–2500 BC) of the Pontic–Caspian steppe located 3,000 km to the west"- before being recorded in 500–1000 CE's Buddhist scriptures.

The Indo-European eastward expansion in the 2nd millennium BCE left an influence on Chinese culture, introducing wheeled vehicles and the domesticated horse. Although much less certain, it may also have introduced iron technology, fighting styles, head-and-hoof rituals, art motifs and myths. By the end of the 2nd millennium BCE, the dominant people as far east as the Altai Mountains southward to the northern outlets of the Tibetan Plateau are described by Christopher I. Beckwith as having "Europoid" or "Caucasian" physical traits, with the northern part speaking Iranian Scythian languages and the southern parts Tocharian languages. Their northeastern neighbors were "Mongoloid" populations. These two groups were in competition with each other until the latter overcame the former. The turning point occurred around the 5th to 4th centuries BCE with a gradual "Mongolization" of Siberia, while Eastern Central Asia (East Turkistan) remained of Indo-European-speaking until well into the 1st millennium CE.

The political history of the Indo-Europeans of Inner Asia from the 2nd century B.C. to the 5th century A.D. is indeed a glorious period. It is their movement which brought China into contact with the Western world as well as with India. These Indo-Europeans held the key to world trade for a long period... In the process of their own transformation, these Indo-Europeans influenced the world around them more than any other people before the rise of Islam."

— A. K. Narain

==== The Yuezhi ====
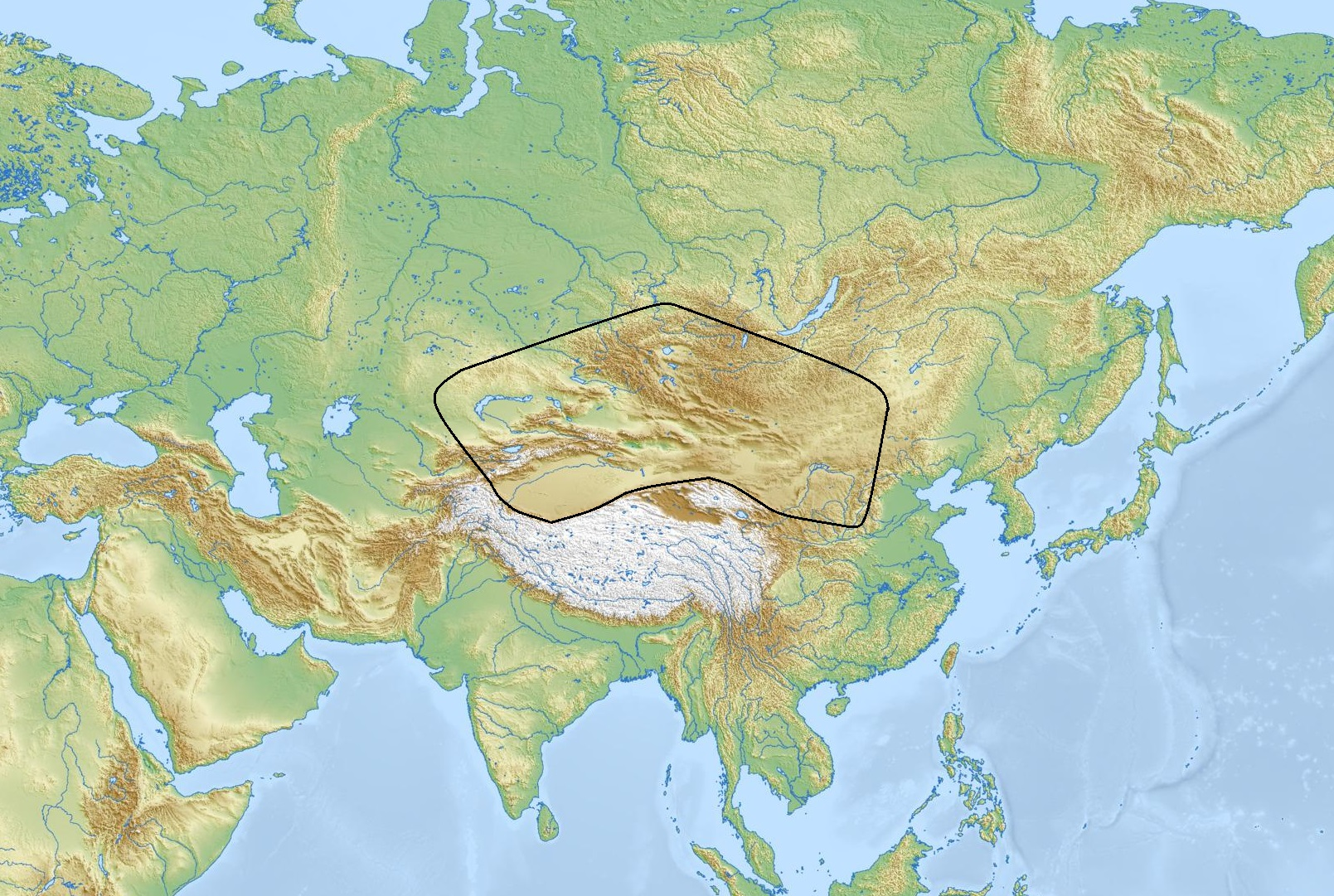
Approximate extent of the Yuezhi Empire, as described in the History of Civilizations of Central Asia by UNESCO

The Sinologist Edwin G. Pulleyblank has suggested that the Yuezhi, the Wusun, the Dayuan, the Kangju and the people of Yanqi, could have been Tocharian-speaking. Of these the Yuezhi are generally held to have been Tocharians. The Yuezhi were originally settled in the arid grasslands of the eastern Tarim Basin area, in what is today Xinjiang and western Gansu, in China.

At the peak of their power in the 3rd century BC, the Yuezhi are believed to have dominated the areas north of the Qilian Mountains (including the Tarim Basin and Dzungaria), the Altai region, the greater part of Mongolia, and the upper waters of the Yellow River. This territory has been referred to as the Yuezhi Empire. Their eastern neighbors were the Donghu. While the Yuezhi were pressuring the Xiongnu from the west, the Donghu were doing the same from the east. A large number of peoples, including the Wusun, the states of the Tarim Basin, and possibly the Qiang, were under the control of the Yuezhi. They were considered the predominant power in Central Asia. Evidence from Chinese records indicate the peoples of Central Asia as far west as the Parthian Empire were under the sway of the Yuezhi. This means that the territory of the Yuezhi Empire roughly corresponded to that of the later First Turkic Khaganate. The Pazyryk burials of the Ukok Plateau coincide with the apex of power of the Yuezhi, and the burials have therefore been attributed to them, which means that the Altai region was part of the Yuezhi Empire.

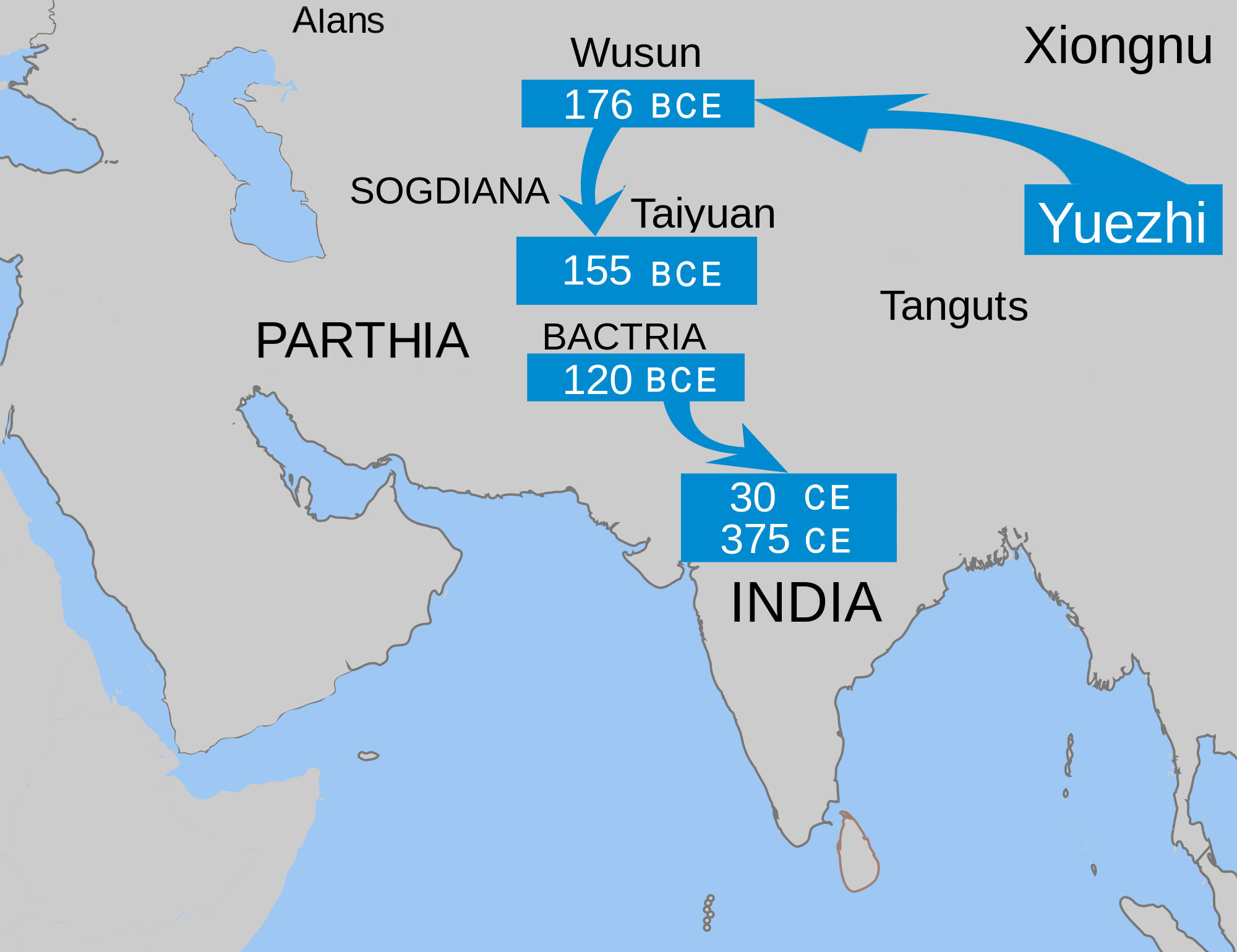
The migrations of the Yuezhi through Central Asia, from around 176 BCE to 30 CE

After the Yuezhi were defeated by the Xiongnu, in the 2nd century BCE, a small group, known as the Little Yuezhi, fled to the south, later spawning the Jie people. During the early 4th century CE, the Jie dominated northern China under the Later Zhao (319–351 CE) until their complete extermination by Ran Min's culling order and the wars amidst their state's collapse. The majority of the Yuezhi however migrated west to the Ili Valley, where they displaced the Sakas (Scythians). Driven from the Ili Valley shortly afterwards by the Wusun, the Yuezhi migrated to Sogdia and then Bactria, where they are often identified with the Tókharoi (Τοχάριοι) and Asioi of Classical sources. They then expanded into northern South Asia, where one branch of the Yuezhi founded the Kushan Empire. The Kushan empire stretched from Turfan in the Tarim Basin to Pataliputra on the Gangetic plain at its greatest extent, and played an important role in the development of the Silk Road and the transmission of Buddhism to China. Tocharian languages continued to be spoken in the city-states of the Tarim Basin, only becoming extinct in the Middle Ages.

== Late Proto-Indo-European - Yamnaya ==
Late PIE is related to the Yamnaya culture and expansion, from which all IE-languages except the Anatolian languages and Tocharian descend.

=== Yamnaya-culture ===
Origins of Yamnaya culture

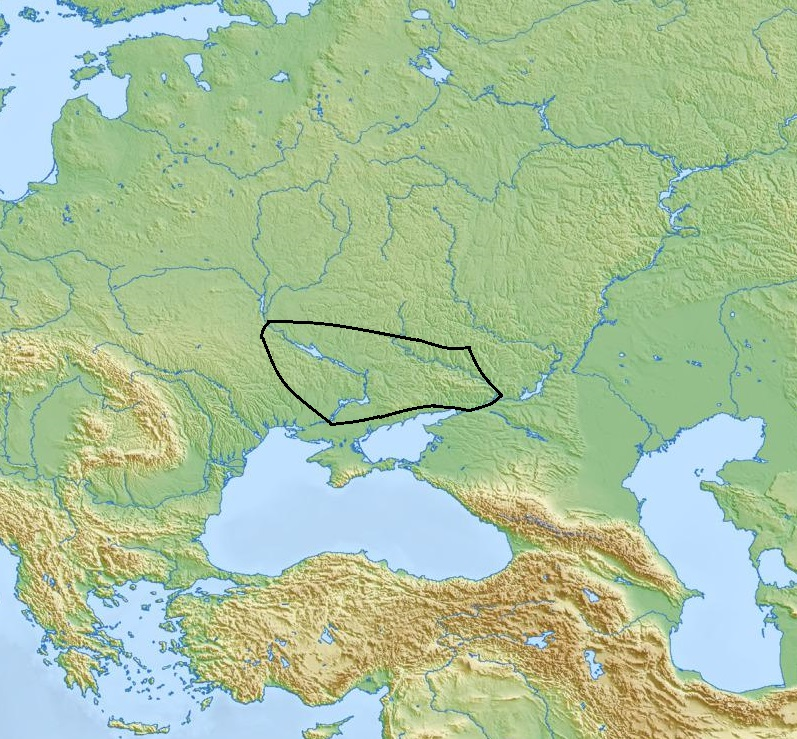
Sredny Stog culture (v.4500–3500 BCE)

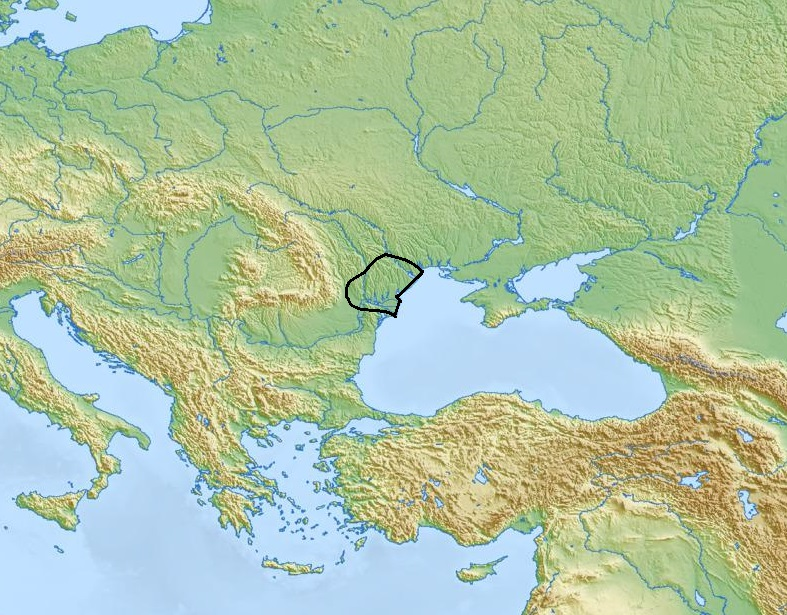
Usatovo culture (c. 3500–3000 BCE)

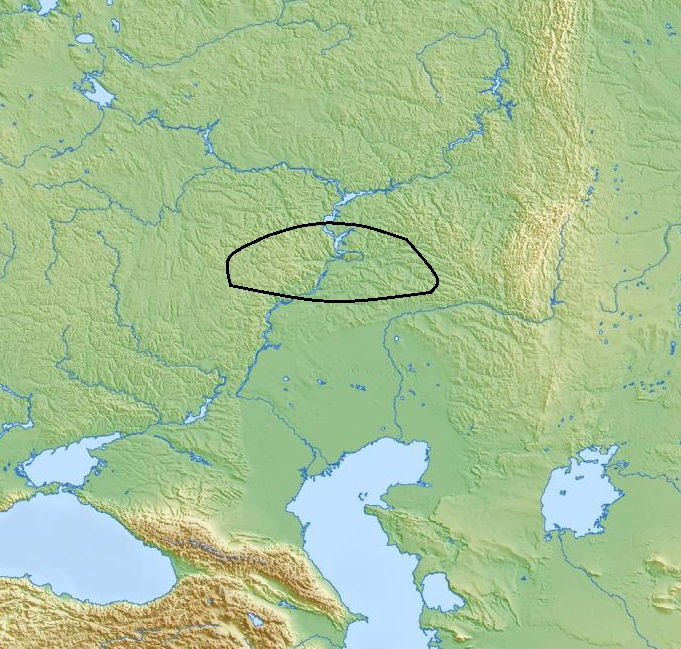
Khvalynsk culture (c. 4900–3500 BCE)

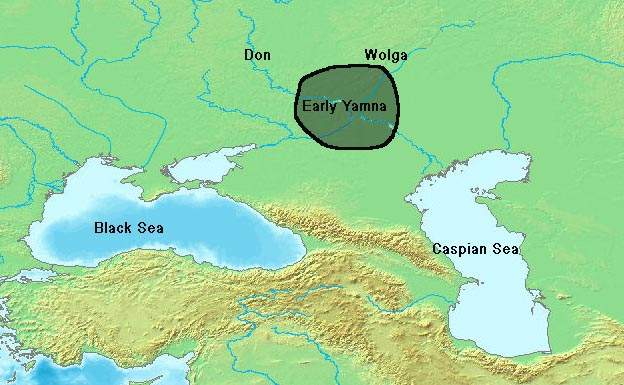
Location of early Yamnaya culture (3400 BCE), according to Anthony 2007.

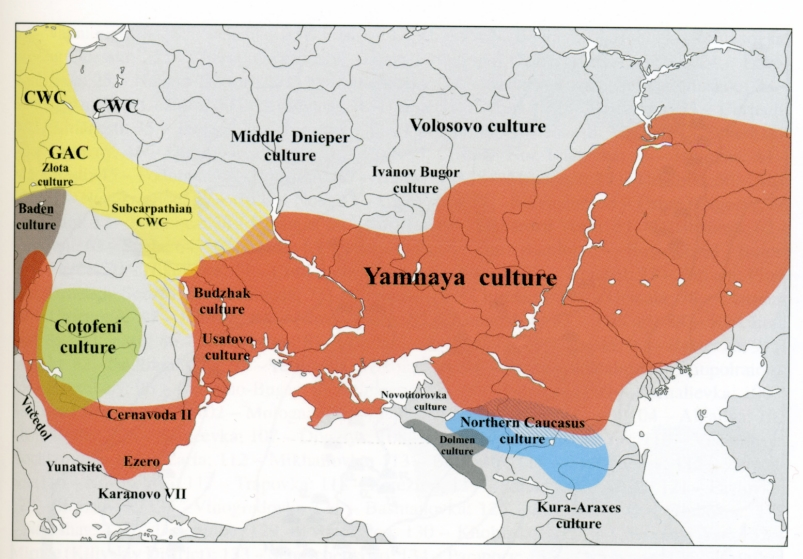
Largest expansion of the Yamnaya culture. Ca. 3500 origins of Usatovo culture; 3400 origins of Yamnaya; c. 3400–3200 expansion of Yamnaya across the Pontic-Caspian steppe; c. 3000 end of Tripolye culture, and transformation of Yamnaya into Corded Ware in the contact zone east of the Carpathian mountains; 3100–2600 Yamnaya-expansion into the Danube Valley.

According to Mallory, "The origin of the Yamnaya culture is still a topic of debate," with proposals for its origins pointing to both Khvalynsk and Sredny Stog. The Khvalynsk culture (4700–3800 BCE) (middle Volga) and the Don-based Repin culture (ca.3950–3300 BCE) in the eastern Pontic-Caspian steppe, and the closely related Sredny Stog culture (c. 4500–3500 BCE) in the western Pontic-Caspian steppe, preceded the Yamnaya culture (3300–2500 BCE). According to Anthony, the Yamnaya culture originated in the Don-Volga area at ca. 3400 BCE, arguing that late pottery from these two cultures can barely be distinguished from early Yamnaya pottery.

The Yamnaya horizon (a.k.a. Pit Grave culture) spread quickly across the Pontic-Caspian steppes between ca. 3400 and 3200 BCE. It was an adaptation to a climate change that occurred between 3500 and 3000 BCE, in which the steppes became drier and cooler. Herds needed to be moved frequently to feed them sufficiently, and the use of wagons and horse-back riding made this possible, leading to "a new, more mobile form of pastoralism". It was accompanied by new social rules and institutions, to regulate the local migrations in the steppes, creating a new social awareness of a distinct culture, and of "cultural Others" who did not participate in these new institutions.

According to Anthony, "the spread of the Yamnaya horizon was the material expression of the spread of late Proto-Indo-European across the Pontic-Caspian steppes." Anthony further notes that "the Yamnaya horizon is the visible archaeological expression of a social adjustment to high mobility – the invention of the political infrastructure to manage larger herds from mobile homes based in the steppes." The Yamnaya horizon represents the classical reconstructed Proto-Indo-European society with stone idols, predominantly practising animal husbandry in permanent settlements protected by hillforts, subsisting on agriculture, and fishing along rivers. According to Gimbutas, contact of the Yamnaya horizon with late Neolithic Europe cultures results in the "kurganized" Globular Amphora and Baden cultures. Anthony excludes the Globular Amphora culture.

The Maykop culture (3700–3000) emerges somewhat earlier in the northern Caucasus. Although considered by Gimbutas as an outgrowth of the steppe cultures, it is related to the development of Mesopotamia, and Anthony does not consider it to be a Proto-Indo-European culture. The Maykop culture shows the earliest evidence of the beginning Bronze Age, and bronze weapons and artifacts are introduced to the Yamnaya horizon.

Between 3100 and 2600 BCE the Yamnaya people spread into the Danube Valley as far as Hungary. According to Anthony, this migration probably gave rise to Proto-Celtic and Pre-Italic. Pre-Germanic dialects may have developed between the Dniestr (west Ukraine) and the Vistula (Poland) at c. 3100–2800 BCE, and spread with the Corded Ware culture. Slavic and Baltic developed at the middle Dniepr (present-day Ukraine) at c. 2800 BCE, also spreading with the Corded Ware horizon.

=== Post-Yamnaya ===
In the northern Don-Volga area the Yamnaya horizon was followed by the Poltavka culture (2700–2100 BCE), while the Corded Ware culture extended eastwards, giving rise to the Sintashta culture (2100–1800). The Sintashta culture extended the Indo-European culture zone east of the Ural mountains, giving rise to Proto-Indo-Iranian and the subsequent spread of the Indo-Iranian languages toward India and the Iranian plateau.

== Europe ==
=== Decline of Neolithic populations ===
Between ca. 4000 and 3000 BCE, Neolithic populations in western Europe declined, probably due to the plague and other viral hemorrhagic fevers. This decline was followed by the migrations of Indo-European-speaking populations into western Europe, transforming the genetic make-up of the western populations. (Note: See also: Spread of Y. pestis, earlier than previously thought, may have caused Neolithic decline; Europe's ancient proto-cities may have been ravaged by the plague; Of Plagues and Prehistory) Haak et al. (2015), Allentoft et al. (2015), and Mathieson et al. (2015) concluded that subclades of Y-DNA haplogroups R1b and R1a and an autosomal component present in modern Europeans which was not present in Neolithic Europeans were introduced by Yamnaya-related populations from the West Eurasian Steppe, along with the Indo-European languages.

During the Chalcolithic and early Bronze Age, the cultures of Europe derived from Early European Farmers (EEF) were overwhelmed by successive invasions of Western Steppe Herders (WSHs) from the Pontic–Caspian steppe, who carried about 60% Eastern Hunter-Gatherer (EHG) and 40% Caucasus Hunter-Gatherer (CHG) admixture. These invasions led to EEF paternal DNA lineages in Europe being almost entirely replaced with EHG/WSH paternal DNA (mainly R1b and R1a). EEF maternal DNA (mainly haplogroup N) also heavily declined, being supplanted by steppe lineages, suggesting the migrations involved both males and females from the steppe. The study argues that more than 90% of Britain's Neolithic gene pool was replaced with the coming of the Beaker people, who were around 50% WSH ancestry. Danish archaeologist Kristian Kristiansen said he is "increasingly convinced there must have been a kind of genocide." According to evolutionary geneticist Eske Willerslev, "There was a heavy reduction of Neolithic DNA in temperate Europe, and a dramatic increase of the new Yamnaya genomic component that was only marginally present in Europe prior to 3000 BC."

=== Origins of the European IE languages ===
The origins of Italo-Celtic, Germanic and Balto-Slavic have often been associated with the spread of the Corded Ware horizon and the Bell Beakers, but the specifics remain unsolved. A complicating factor is the association of haplogroup R1b with the Yamnaya horizon and the Bell Beakers, while the Corded Ware horizon is strongly associated with haplogroup R1a. Ancestors of Germanic and Balto-Slavic may have spread with the Corded Ware, originating east of the Carpathians, while the Danube Valley was ancestral to Italo-Celtic.

==== Relations between the branches ====
According to David Anthony, pre-Germanic split off earliest (3300 BCE), followed by pre-Italic and pre-Celtic (3000 BCE), pre-Armenian (2800 BCE), pre-Balto-Slavic (2800 BCE) and pre-Greek (2500 BCE).

Mallory notes that the Italic, Celtic and Germanic languages are closely related, which accords with their historic distribution. The Germanic languages are also related to the Baltic and Slavic languages, which in turn share similarities with the Indo-Iranic languages. The Greek, Armenian and Indo-Iranian languages are also related, which suggests "a chain of central Indo-European dialects stretching from the Balkans across the Black sea to the east Caspian". And the Celtic, Italic, Anatolian and Tocharian languages preserve archaisms which are preserved only in those languages.

Although Corded Ware is presumed to be largely derived from the Yamnaya culture, most Corded Ware males carried R1a Y-DNA, while males of the Yamnaya primarily carried R1b-M269. (Note: Y-DNA: * Malmström 2019: "Individuals from the Pontic–Caspian steppe, associated with the Yamnaya Culture, carry mostly R1b and not R1a haplotypes." Linderholm 2020: "The Y chromosome haplogroup lineage R1b-M269 or R-L11 are characteristic of Yamnaya and Bell Beaker individuals and they were particularly widespread throughout Eurasia in the Bronze Age and thereafter. Curiously, the haplogroup is uncommon among other published Corded Ware Complex individuals from Europe (Germany, Poland, Bohemia, Estonia, Lithuania) and is associated with the later Bell Beaker communities." Sjögren (2020): "All the Bell Beaker male burials with sufficient data in our two cemeteries belong to a single Y-chromosome lineage, R1b-M269, which is the major lineage associated with the arrival of Steppe ancestry in western Europe after 2500 BC. In the preceding and partly contemporary Corded Ware populations of central Europe, another Y-haplogroup dominated, R1a, although R1b also occurs albeit in small numbers." Yet, Linderholm et al. (2020) found seven CW males with R1b-M269, while Allentoft et al. (2015) report two CW males with R1b, and Furtwängler et al. (2020) report three CW males with R1b.) According to Sjögren et al. (2020), R1b-M269 "is the major lineage associated with the arrival of Steppe ancestry in western Europe after 2500 BC[E]," and is strongly related to the Bell Beaker expansion.

==== The Balkan-Danubian complex and the east-Carpathian contact-zone ====
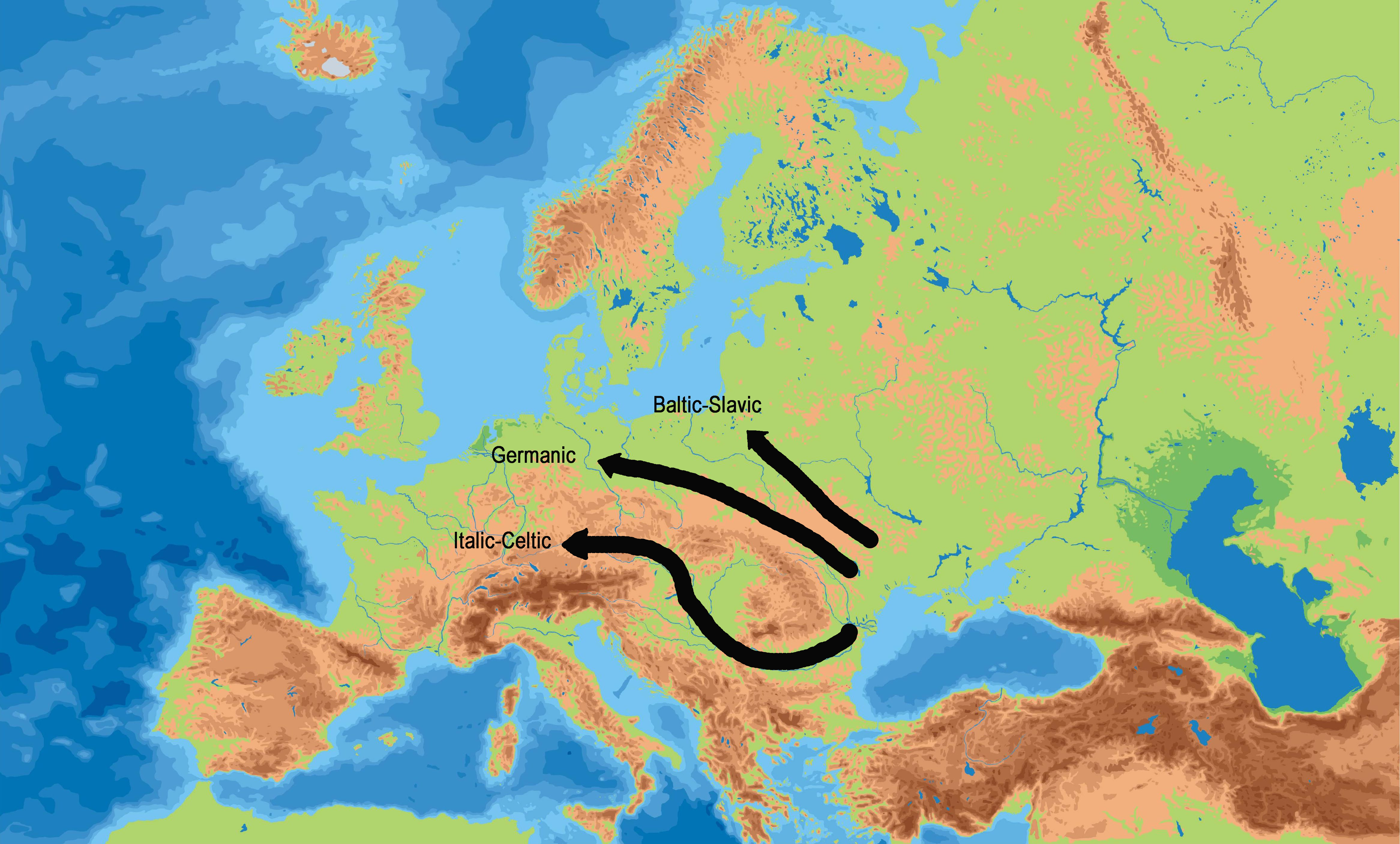
IE migrations north and south of the Carpathian Mountains, and the subsequent development of Celtic, Germanic, and Balto-Slavic, according to Anthony (2007)

Dniestr,
Vistula, Dniepr

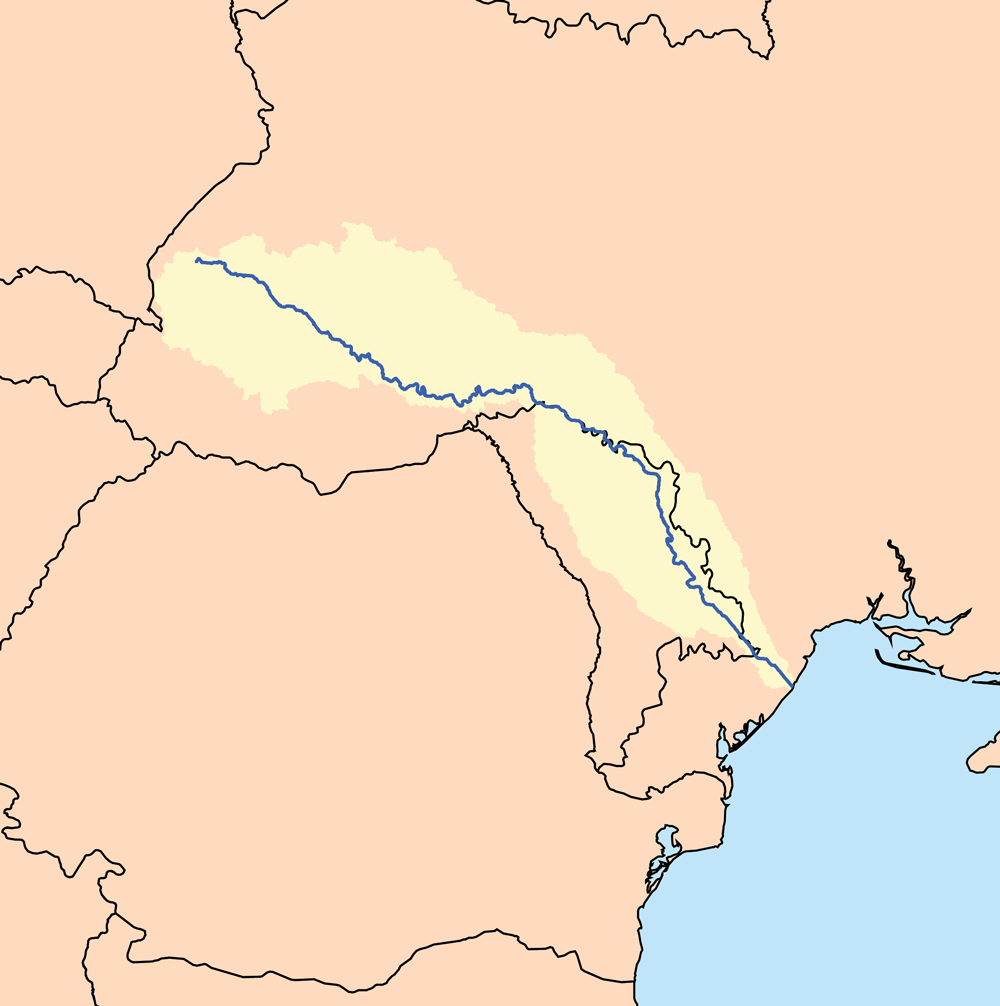
Dniester river

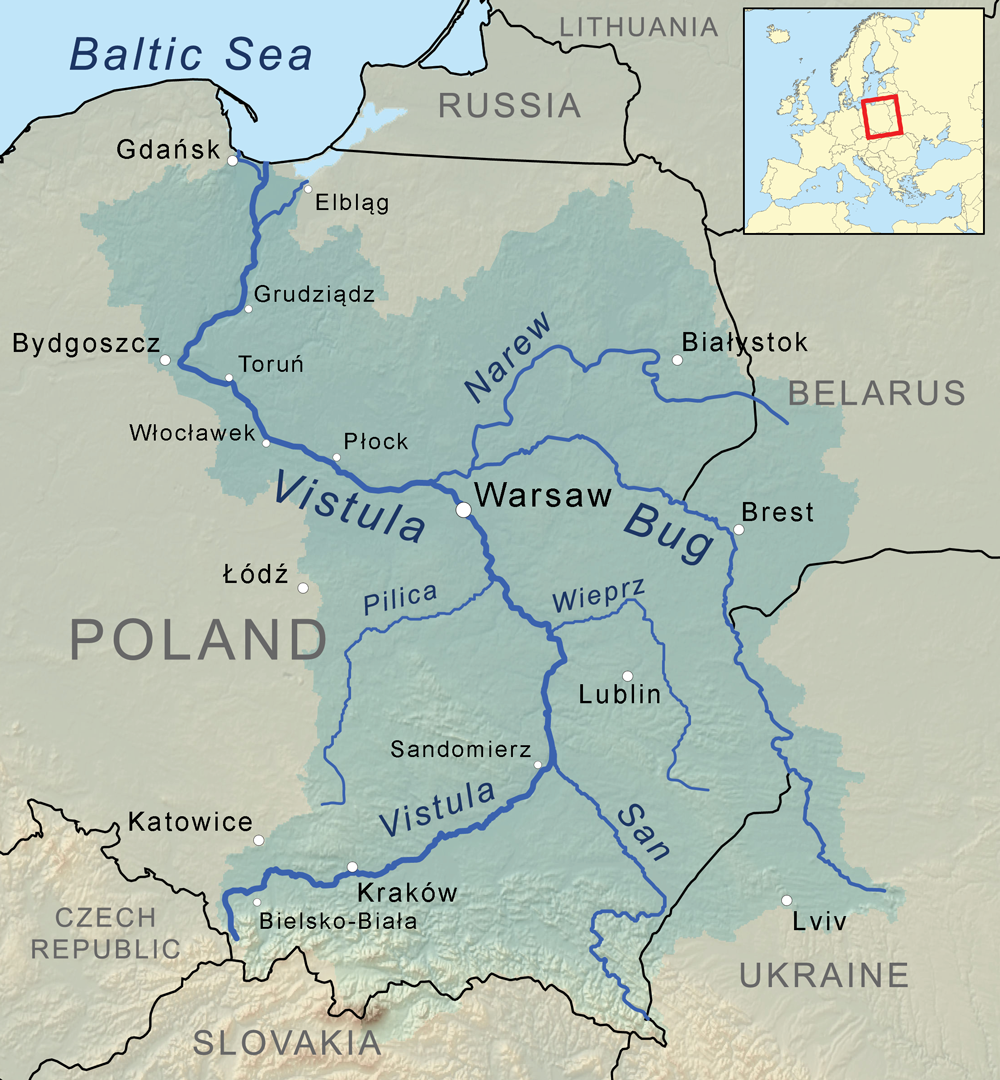
Vistula river

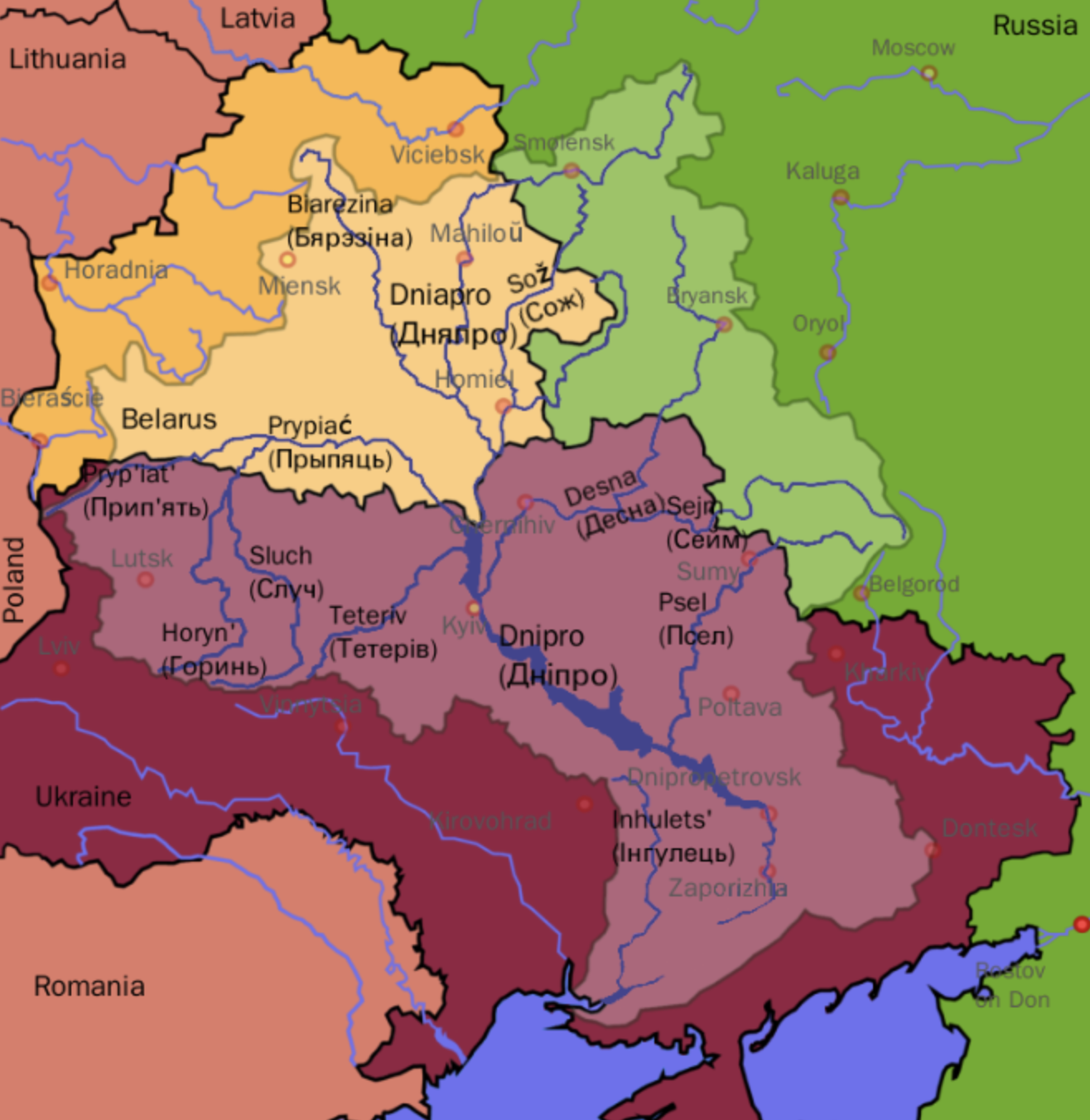
Dniepr river

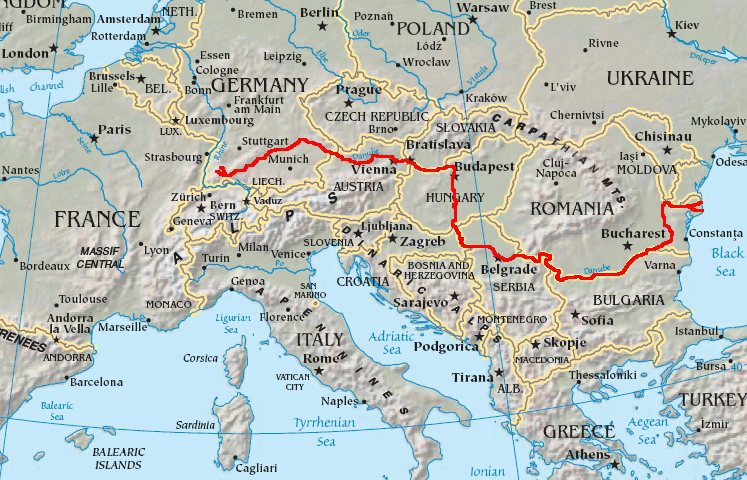
Course of the Danube, marked in red

The Balkan-Danubian complex is a set of cultures in Southeast Europe, east and west of the Carpathian mountains, from which the western Indo-European languages probably spread into western Europe from c. 3500 BCE. The area east of the Carpathian mountains formed a contact zone between the expanding Yamnaya culture and the northern European farmer cultures. According to Anthony, Pre-Italic and Pre-Celtic (related by Anthony to the Danube valley), and Pre-Germanic and Balto-Slavic (related by Anthony to the east-Carpathian contact zone) may have split off here from Proto-Indo-European.

Anthony (2007) postulates the Usatovo culture as the origin of the pre-Germanic branch. It developed east of the Carpathian mountains, south-eastern Central Europe, at around 3300–3200 BCE at the Dniestr river. Although closely related to the Tripolye culture, it is contemporary with the Yamnaya culture, and resembles it in significant ways. According to Anthony, it may have originated with "steppe clans related to the Yamnaya horizon who were able to impose a patron-client relationship on Tripolye farming villages".

According to Anthony, the Pre-Germanic dialects may have developed in this culture between the Dniestr (west Ukraine) and the Vistula (Poland) at c. 3100–2800 BCE, and spread with the Corded Ware culture. Slavic and Baltic developed at the middle Dniepr (present-day Ukraine) at c. 2800 BCE, spreading north from there.

Anthony (2017) relates the origins of the Corded Ware to the Yamnaya migrations into Hungary. Between 3100 and 2800/2600 BCE, when the Yamnaya horizon spread fast across the Pontic Steppe, a real folk migration of Proto-Indo-European speakers from the Yamna-culture took place into the Danube Valley, moving along Usatovo territory toward specific destinations, reaching as far as Hungary, where as many as 3,000 kurgans may have been raised. According to Anthony (2007), Bell Beaker sites at Budapest, dated c. 2800–2600 BCE, may have aided in spreading Yamnaya dialects into Austria and southern Germany at their west, where Proto-Celtic may have developed. Pre-Italic may have developed in Hungary, and spread toward Italy via the Urnfield culture and Villanovan culture.

According to Parpola, this migration into the Danube Valley is related to the appearance of Indo-European speakers from Europe into Anatolia, and the appearance of Hittite.

According to Lazaridis et al. (2022), the speakers of Albanian, Greek and other Paleo-Balkan languages, go back directly to the migration of Yamnaya steppe pastoralists into the Balkans about 5000 to 4500 years ago, admixting with the local populations. Latin expanded after the Roman conquest of the Balkans, and in the early Middle Ages the territory was settled and occupied by migrating Slavic people, and by east Asian steppe peoples. After the spread of Latin and Slavic, Albanian is the only surviving representative of the poorly attested ancient Balkan languages.

==== Corded Ware culture (3000–2400 BCE) ====
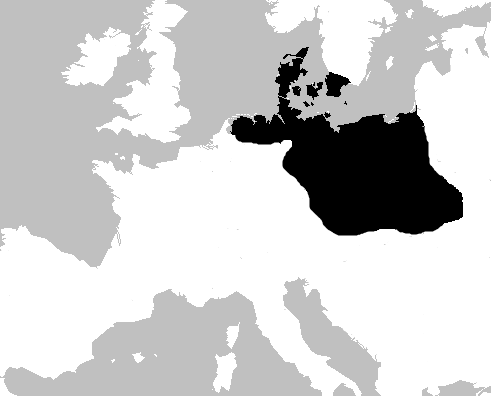
Extent of the Funnelbeaker culture (Trichterbecherkultur, TRB) c. 4300–2800 BCE

Approximate extent of the Corded Ware horizon with adjacent third-millennium cultures (Baden culture and Globular Amphora culture; after EIEC)

The Corded Ware culture in Middle Europe (c. 3200 or 2,900–2450 or 2350 cal. BCE) probably played an essential role in the origin and spread of the Indo-European languages in Europe during the Copper and Bronze Ages. David Anthony states that "Childe (1953:133-38) and Gimbutas (1963) speculated that migrants from the steppe Yamnaya horizon (3300–2600 BCE) might have been the creators of the Corded Ware culture and carried IE languages into Europe from the steppes."

According to Anthony (2007), the Corded Ware originated north-east of the Carpathian mountains, and spread across northern Europe after 3000 BCE, with an "initial rapid spread" between 2900 and 2700 BCE. While Anthony (2007) situates the development of pre-Germanic dialects east of the Carpathians, arguing for a migration up the Dniestr, Anthony (2017) relates the origins of the Corded Ware to the early third century Yamna-migrations into the Danube-valley, stating that "[t]he migration stream that created these intrusive cemeteries now can be seen to have continued from eastern Hungary across the Carpathians into southern Poland, where the earliest material traits of the Corded ware horizon appeared." In southern Poland, interaction between Scandinavian and Global Amphora resulted in a new culture, absorbed by the incoming Yamnaya pastoralists. (Note: A major problem with Anthony's proposal is that those Yamna-migrants were R1b-carriers, which also appears in the Bell-Beaker people, while the Corded Ware people seem to have been R1a-carriers, which has not been found among Yamna-people. See: Eurogenes Blog (18 December 2017), Corded Ware as an offshoot of Hungarian Yamnaya (Anthony 2017); Indo-European.eu (17 December 2017), The new "Indo-European Corded Ware Theory" of David Anthony; Indo-European.eu (26 December 2017), The Great Hungarian Plain in a time of change in the Balkans – Neolithic, Chalcolithic, and Bronze Age.) (Note: Haak et al. (2015) envision a migration of both males and females from the Yamnaya horizon through western Ukraine and Poland into Germany. Allentoft et al. (2015) envision a migration from the Yamnaya horizon towards northern Europe, both via Central Europe and the territory of present-day Russia, toward the Baltic area and the eastern periphery of the Corded Ware culture. Nordqvist and Heyd (2020) envision that the Yamnaya culture spread northwards and transformed into the Corded Ware horizon east of the Carpathians, and from there spread to northwestern Europe and eastern Europe.)

According to Mallory (1999), the Corded Ware culture may be postulated as "the common prehistoric ancestor of the later Celtic, Germanic, Baltic, Slavic, and possibly some of the Indo-European languages of Italy". Yet, Mallory also notes that the Corded Ware can not account for Greek, Illyrian, Thracian and East Italic, which may be derived from Southeast Europe. According to Anthony, the Corded Ware horizon may have introduced Germanic, Baltic and Slavic into northern Europe.

According to Gimbutas, the Corded Ware culture was preceded by the Globular Amphora culture (3400–2800 BCE), which she also regarded to be an Indo-European culture. The Globular Amphora culture stretched from central Europe to the Baltic sea, and emerged from the Funnelbeaker culture. According to Mallory, around 2400 BCE the people of the Corded Ware replaced their predecessors and expanded to Danubian and northern areas of western Germany. A related branch invaded the territories of present-day Denmark and southern Sweden. In places a continuity between Funnelbeaker and Corded Ware can be demonstrated, whereas in other areas Corded Ware heralds a new culture and physical type. According to Cunliffe, most of the expansion was clearly intrusive. Yet, according to Furholt, the Corded Ware culture was an indigenous development, connecting local developments into a larger network.

Recent research by Haak et al. found that four late Corded Ware people (2500–2300 BCE) buried at Esperstadt, Germany, were genetically very close to the Yamna-people, suggesting that a massive migration took place from the Eurasian steppes to Central Europe. According to Haak et al. (2015), German Corded Ware "trace ~75% of their ancestry to the Yamna." In supplementary information to Haak et al. (2015) Anthony, together with Lazaridis, Haak, Patterson, and Reich, notes that the mass migration of Yamnaya people to northern Europe shows that "the languages could have been introduced simply by strength of numbers: via major migration in which both sexes participated." (Note: They further note: "[...] the main argument in favor of the Anatolian hypothesis (that major language change requires major migration) can now also be applied to the Steppe hypothesis."; "[...] our results level the playing field between the two leading hypotheses [the Steppe hypotheses and the Anatolian hypothesis] of Indo-European origins, as we now know that both the Early Neolithic and the Late Neolithic were associated with major migrations.")

Volker Heyd has cautioned to be careful with drawing too strong conclusions from those genetic similarities between Corded Ware and Yamna, noting the small number of samples; the late dates of the Esperstadt graves, which could also have undergone Bell Beaker admixture; the presence of Yamna-ancestry in western Europe before the Danube-expansion; and the risks of extrapolating "the results from a handful of individual burials to whole ethnically interpreted populations." Heyd confirms the close connection between Corded Ware and Yamna, but also states that "neither a one-to-one translation from Yamnaya to CWC, nor even the 75:25 ratio as claimed (Haak et al. 2015:211) fits the archaeological record."

==== Bell Beaker culture (2900–1800 BCE) ====
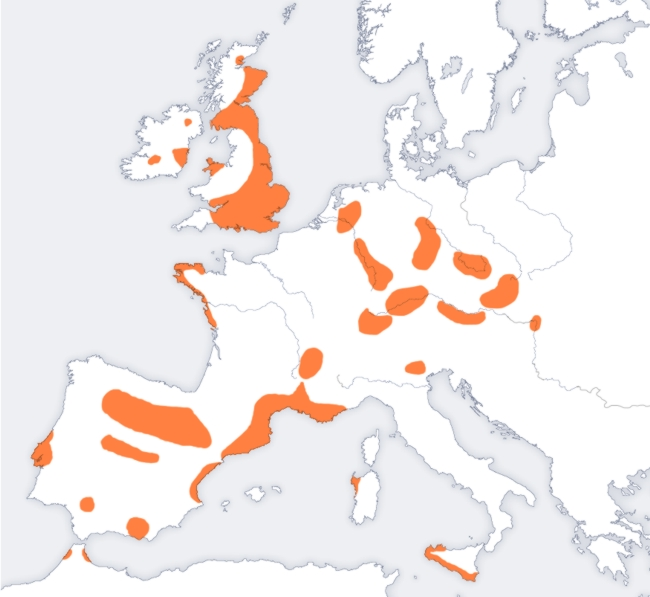
Extent of the Beaker-culture

Generalised distribution and movements of Bell-Beaker cultures

The Bell Beaker-culture (c. 2900–1800 BCE) may be ancestral to proto-Celtic, which spread westward from the Alpine regions and formed a "North-west Indo-European" Sprachbund with Italic, Germanic and Balto-Slavic. (Note: See also Indo-European.eu (2017), Heyd, Mallory, and Prescott were right about Bell Beakers.)

The initial moves of the Bell Beakers from the Tagus estuary, Portugal were maritime. A southern move led to the Mediterranean where 'enclaves' were established in southwestern Spain and southern France around the Golfe du Lion and into the Po Valley in Italy, probably via ancient western Alpine trade routes used to distribute jadeite axes. A northern move incorporated the southern coast of Armorica. The enclave established in southern Brittany was linked closely to the riverine and landward route, via the Loire, and across the Gâtinais valley to the Seine valley, and thence to the lower Rhine. This was a long-established route reflected in early stone axe distributions and it was via this network that Maritime Bell Beakers first reached the Lower Rhine in about 2600 BCE.

=== Germanic ===
Germanic origins and dispersal

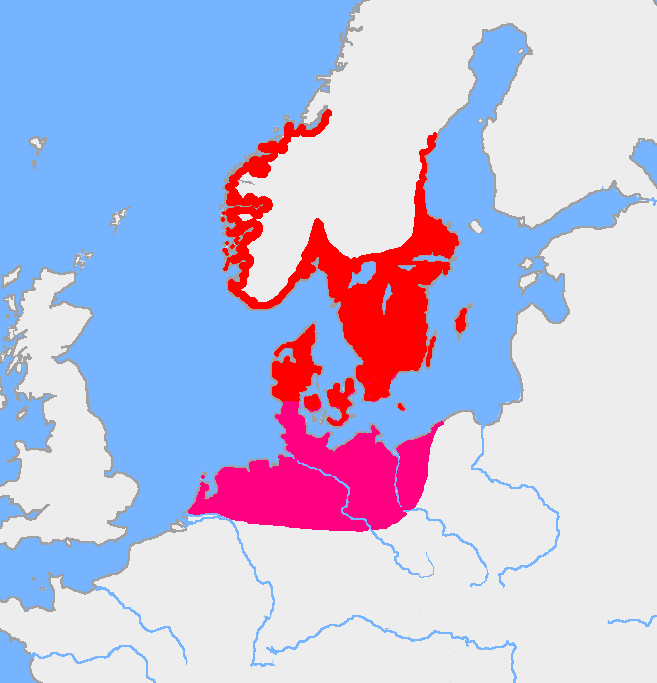
Map of the pre-Roman Iron Age in Northern Europe showing cultures associated with Proto-Germanic, c. 500 BC. The area of the preceding Nordic Bronze Age in Scandinavia is shown in red; magenta areas towards the south represent the Jastorf culture of the North German Plain.

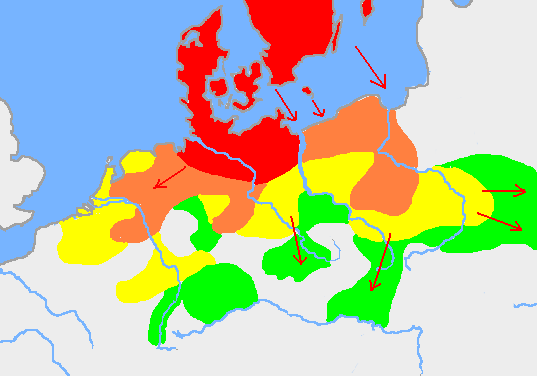
The expansion of the Germanic tribes 750 BC – AD 1 (after The Penguin Atlas of World History, 1988): Settlements before 750 BC New settlements 750–500 BC New settlements 500–250 BC New settlements 250 BC – AD 1 Some sources also give a date of 750 BC for the earliest expansion out of southern Scandinavia along the North Sea coast towards the mouth of the Rhine.

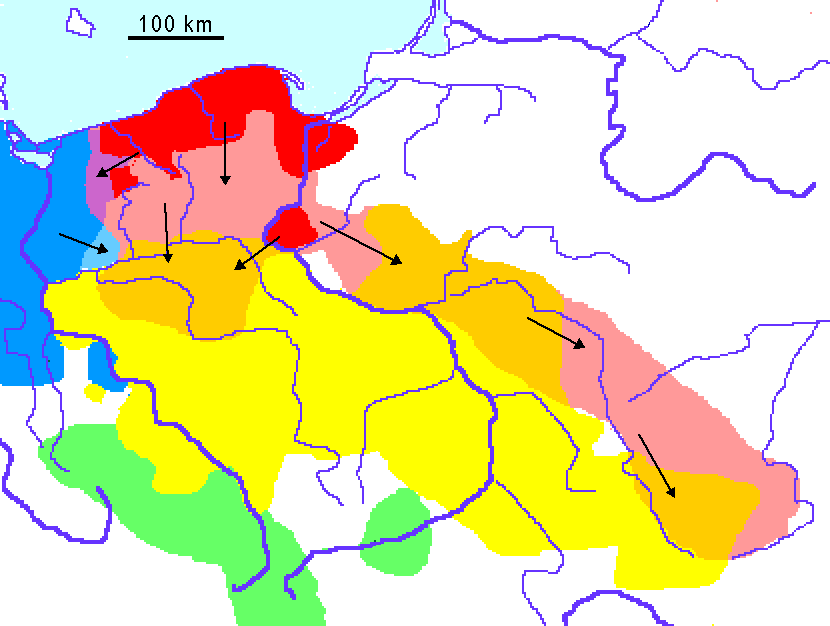
The early East Germanic expansion (1st and 2nd centuries AD): Jastorf culture (blue), Oksywie culture (red), Przeworsk culture (yellow/orange); eastward expansion of the Wielbark culture (light-red/orange).

The Germanic peoples (also called Teutonic, Suebian or Gothic in older literature) were an Indo-European ethno-linguistic group of Northern European origin, identified by their use of the Germanic languages which diversified out of Proto-Germanic starting during the Pre-Roman Iron Age.

According to Mallory, Germanicists "generally agree" that the Urheimat ('original homeland') of the Proto-Germanic language, the ancestral idiom of all attested Germanic dialects, was primarily situated in an area corresponding to the extent of the Jastorf culture, (Note: Ringe (2006), p. 85: "Early Jastorf, at the end of the 7th century BCE, is almost certainly too early for the last common ancestor of the attested languages; but later Jastorf culture and its successors occupy so much territory that their populations are most unlikely to have spoken a single dialect, even granting that the expansion of the culture was relatively rapid. It follows that our reconstructed PGmc was only one of the dialects spoken by peoples identified archeologically, or by the Romans, as 'Germans'; the remaining Germanic peoples spoke sister dialects of PGmc." Polomé (1992), p. 51: "...if the Jastorf culture and, probably, the neighboring Harpstedt culture to the west constitute the Germanic homeland (Mallory 1989: 87), a spread of Proto-Germanic northwards and eastwards would have to be assumed, which might explain both the archaisms and the innovative features of North Germanic and East Germanic, and would fit nicely with recent views locating the homeland of the Goths in Poland.") situated in Denmark and northern Germany.

According to Herrin, the Germanic peoples are believed to have emerged about 1800 BCE with the Nordic Bronze Age (c. 1700-500 BCE). The Nordic Bronze Age developed from the absorption of the hunter-gatherer Pitted Ware culture (c. 3500-2300 BCE) into the agricultural Battle Axe culture (c. 2800-2300 BCE), which in turn developed from the superimposition of the Corded Ware culture (c. 3100-2350 BCE) upon the Funnelbeaker culture (c. 4300-2800 BCE) on the North European Plain, adjacent to the north of the Bell Beaker culture (c. 2800–2300 BCE). Pre-Germanic may have been related to the Slavo-Baltic and Indo-Iranian languages, but reoriented towards the Italo-Celtic languages. (Note: John Koch (2018), Formation of the Indo-European Branches in the light of the Archaeogenetic Revolution)

By the early 1st millennium BC, Proto-Germanic is believed to have been spoken in the areas of present-day Denmark, southern Sweden, southern Norway and Northern Germany. Over time this area was expanded to include and a strip of land on the North European plain stretching from Flanders to the Vistula. Around 28% of the Germanic vocabulary is of non-Indo-European origin.

By the 3rd century BC, the Pre-Roman Iron Age arose among the Germanic peoples, who were at the time expanding southwards at the expense of the Celts and Illyrians. During the subsequent centuries, migrating Germanic peoples reached the banks of the Rhine and the Danube along the Roman border, and also expanded into the territories of Iranian peoples north of the Black Sea.

In the late 4th century, the Huns invaded the Germanic territories from the east, forcing many Germanic tribes to migrate into the Western Roman Empire. During the Viking Age, which began in the 8th century, the North Germanic peoples of Scandinavia migrated throughout Europe, establishing settlements as far as North America. The migrations of the Germanic peoples in the 1st millennium were a formative element in the distribution of peoples in modern Europe.

=== Italo-Celtic ===
Italic and Celtic languages are commonly grouped together on the basis of features shared by these two branches and no others. This could imply that they are descended from a common ancestor and/or Proto-Celtic and Proto-Italic developed in close proximity over a long period of time. The Italic languages, like Celtic ones, are split into P and Q forms: P-Italic includes Oscan and Umbrian, while Latin and Faliscan are included in the Q-Italic branch.

The link to the Yamnaya-culture, in the contact zone of western and central Europe between Rhine and Vistula (Poland), is as follows: Yamnaya culture (c. 3300–2600 BC) – Corded Ware culture (c. 3100–2350 BCE) – Bell Beaker culture (c. 2800–1800 BC) – Unetice culture (c. 2300–1680 BCE) – Tumulus culture (c. 1600–1200 BCE) – Urnfield culture (c. 1300–750 BCE). At the Balkan, the Vučedol culture (c. 3000–2200 BCE) formed a contact zone between post-Yamnaya and Bell Beaker culture.

==== Italic ====
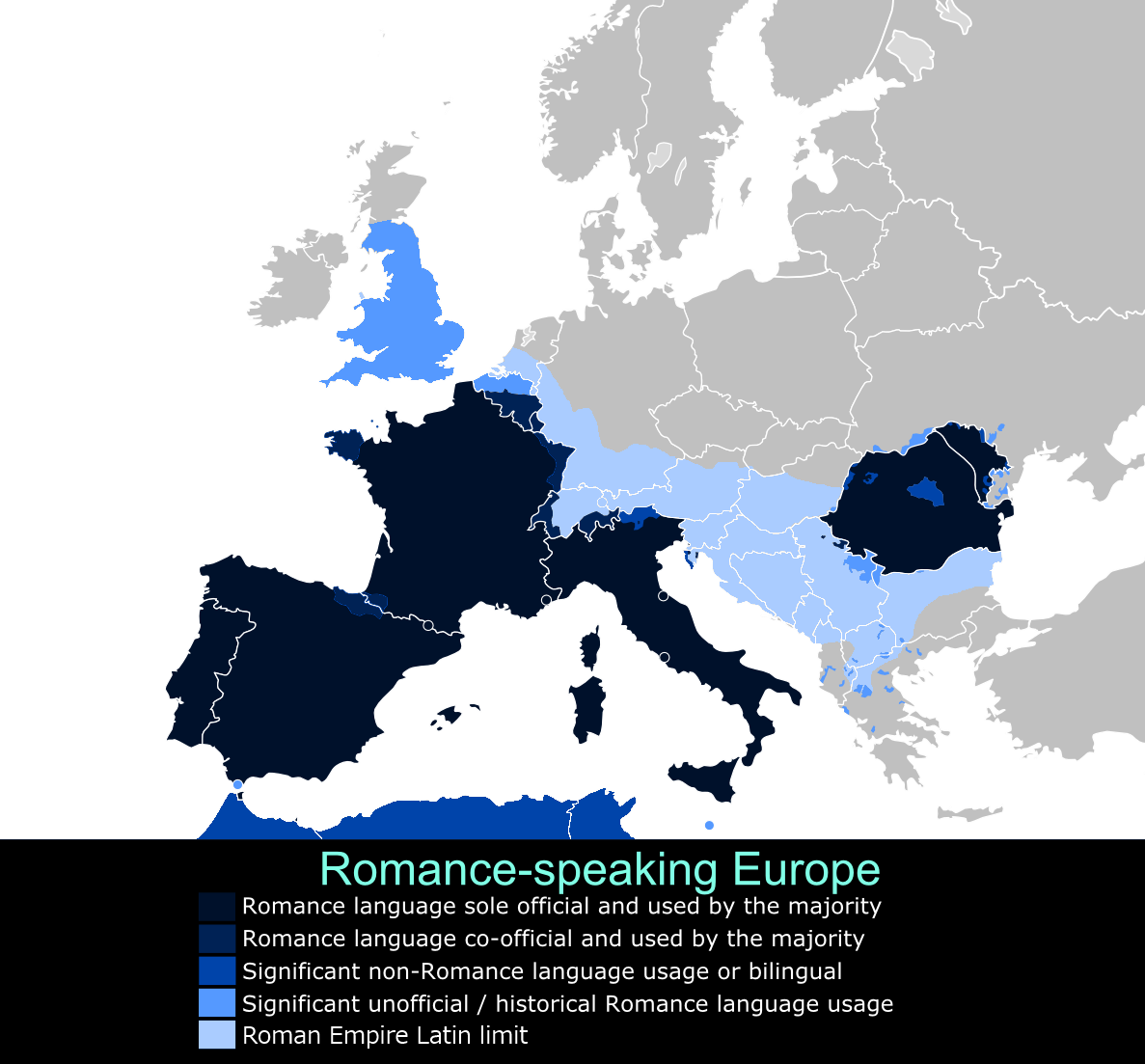
Romance languages in Europe

The Italic languages are a subfamily of the Indo-European language family originally spoken by Italic peoples. They include the Romance languages derived from Latin (Italian, Sardinian, Spanish, Catalan, Portuguese, French, Romanian, Occitan, etc.); a number of extinct languages of the Italian Peninsula, including Umbrian, Oscan, Faliscan, South Picene; and Latin itself. At present, Latin and its daughter Romance languages are the only surviving languages of the Italic language family.

The most widely accepted theory suggests that Latins and other proto-Italic tribes first entered in Italy with the late Bronze Age Proto-Villanovan culture (12th–10th cent. BCE), then part of the central European Urnfield culture system (1300–750 BCE). In particular various authors, like Marija Gimbutas, had noted important similarities between Proto-Villanova, the South-German Urnfield culture of Bavaria-Upper Austria and Middle-Danube Urnfield culture. According to David W. Anthony, proto-Latins originated in today's eastern Hungary, kurganized around 3100 BCE by the Yamnaya culture, while Kristian Kristiansen associated the Proto-Villanovans with the Velatice-Baierdorf culture of Moravia and Austria.

Today the Romance languages, which comprise all languages that descended from Latin, are spoken by more than 800 million native speakers worldwide, mainly in the Americas, Europe, and Africa. Romance languages are either official, co-official, or significantly used in 72 countries around the globe.

==== Celtic ====
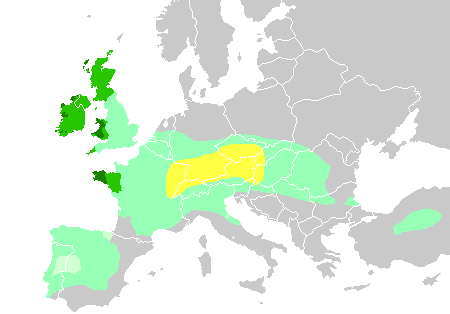
Diachronic distribution of Celtic peoples: core Hallstatt territory, by the 6th century BCE maximal Celtic expansion, by 275 BCE Lusitanian area of Iberia where Celtic presence is uncertain the six Celtic nations which retained significant numbers of Celtic speakers into the Early Modern period areas where Celtic languages remain widely spoken today

The Celts (/ˈkɛlts/, occasionally /ˈsɛlts/, see pronunciation of Celtic) or Kelts were an ethnolinguistic group of tribal societies in Iron Age and Medieval Europe who spoke Celtic languages and had a similar culture, although the relationship between the ethnic, linguistic and cultural elements remains uncertain and controversial.

The earliest archaeological culture that may justifiably be considered Proto-Celtic is the Late Bronze Age Urnfield culture of Central Europe, which flourished from around 1200 BCE.

Their fully Celtic descendants in central Europe were the people of the Iron Age Hallstatt culture (c. 800–450 BCE) named for the rich grave finds in Hallstatt, Austria. By the later La Tène period (c. 450 BCE up to the Roman conquest), this Celtic culture had expanded by diffusion or migration to the British Isles (Insular Celts), France and The Low Countries (Gauls), Bohemia, Poland and much of Central Europe, the Iberian Peninsula (Celtiberians, Celtici and Gallaeci) and Italy (Golaseccans, Lepontii, Ligures and Cisalpine Gauls) and, following the Gallic invasion of the Balkans in 279 BCE, as far east as central Anatolia (Galatians).

The Celtic languages (usually pronounced /ˈkɛltɪk/ but sometimes /ˈsɛltɪk/) are descended from Proto-Celtic, or "Common Celtic"; a branch of the greater Indo-European language family. The term "Celtic" was first used to describe this language group by Edward Lhuyd in 1707.

Modern Celtic languages are mostly spoken on the northwestern edge of Europe, notably in Ireland, Scotland, Wales, Brittany, Cornwall, and the Isle of Man, and can be found spoken on Cape Breton Island. There are also a substantial number of Welsh speakers in the Patagonia area of Argentina. Some people speak Celtic languages in the other Celtic diaspora areas of the United States, Canada, Australia, and New Zealand. In all these areas, the Celtic languages are now only spoken by minorities though there are continuing efforts at revitalization. Welsh is the only Celtic language not classified as "endangered" by UNESCO.

During the 1st millennium BCE, they were spoken across much of Europe, in the Iberian Peninsula, from the Atlantic and North Sea coastlines, up to the Rhine valley and down the Danube valley to the Black Sea, the northern Balkan Peninsula and in central Asia Minor. The spread to Cape Breton and Patagonia occurred in modern times. Celtic languages, particularly Irish, were spoken in Australia before federation in 1901 and are still used there to some extent.

=== Balto-Slavic ===
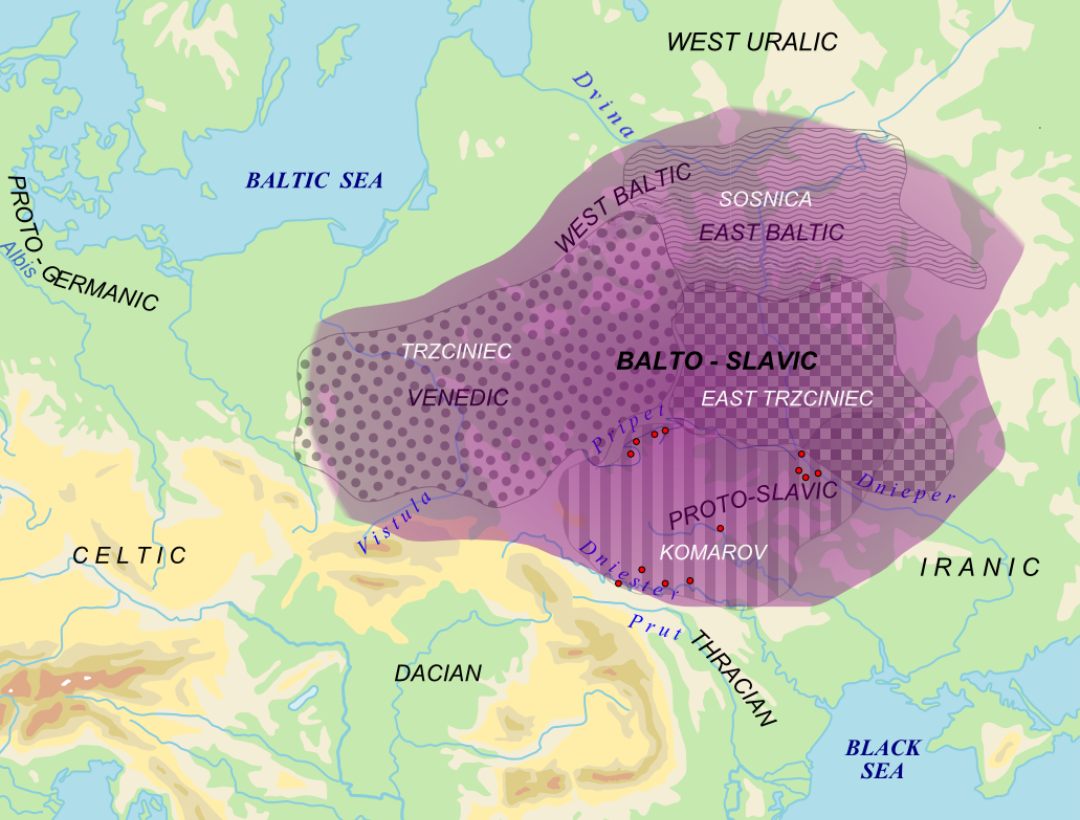
Area of Balto-Slavic dialectic continuum (purple) with proposed material cultures correlating to speakers Balto-Slavic in Bronze Age (white). Red dots indicate archaic Slavic hydronyms.

The Balto-Slavic language group traditionally comprises the Baltic and Slavic languages, belonging to the Indo-European family of languages. Baltic and Slavic languages share several linguistic traits not found in any other Indo-European branch, which points to a period of common development. Most Indo-Europeanists classify Baltic and Slavic languages into a single branch, even though some details of the nature of their relationship remain in dispute in some circles, usually due to political controversies. As an alternative to the model of a binary split into Slavic and Baltic, some linguists suggest that Balto-Slavic should be split into three equidistant nodes: Eastern Baltic, Western Baltic and Slavic.

A Proto-Balto-Slavic language is reconstructable by the comparative method, descending from Proto-Indo-European by means of well-defined sound laws, and out of which modern Slavic and Baltic languages descended. One particularly innovative dialect separated from the Balto-Slavic dialect continuum and became ancestral to the Proto-Slavic language, from which all Slavic languages descended. Some linguists, however, reject the Balto-Slavic theory, believing that Baltic and Slavic languages evolved independently from Proto-Baltic and Proto-Slavic respectively.

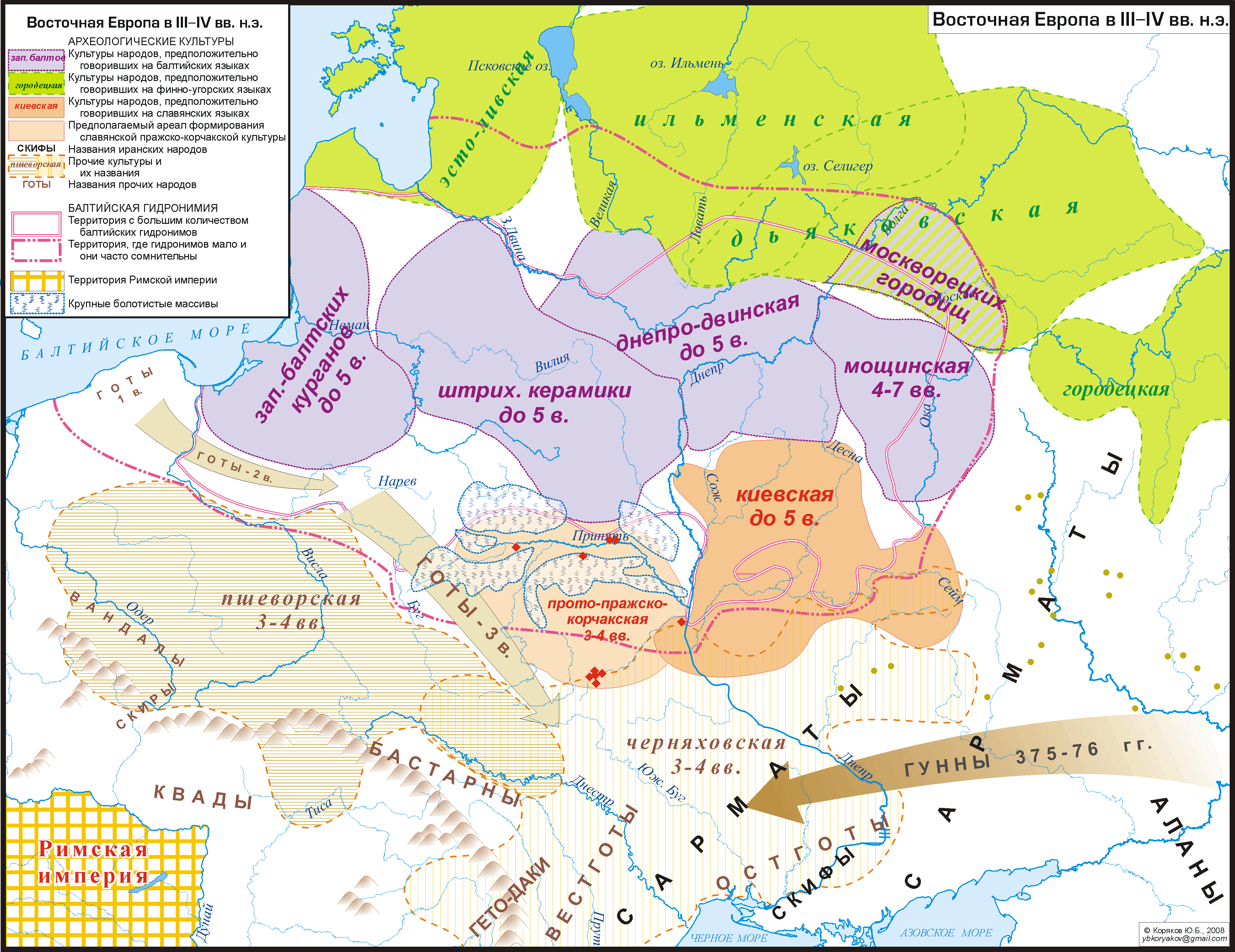
Eastern Europe in 3rd–4th century CE with archaeological cultures identified as Baltic-speaking in purple. Their area extended from the Baltic Sea to modern Moscow.

==== Balts ====
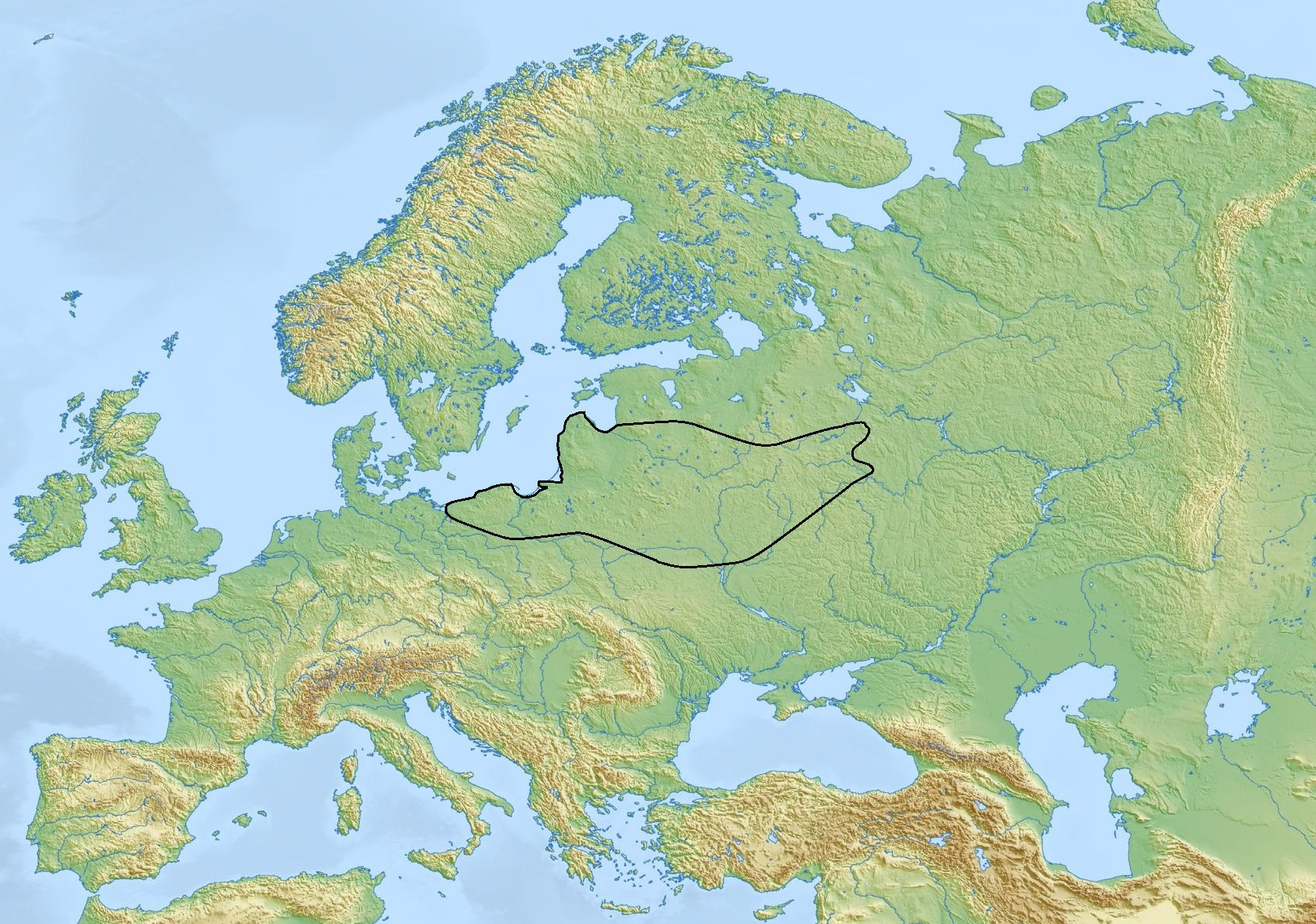
Map of the area of distribution of Baltic hydronyms. This area is considered the Urheimat of the Balts.

The Balts or Baltic peoples (Lithuanian: baltai, Latvian: balti) are an Indo-European ethno-linguistic group who speak the Baltic languages, a branch of the Indo-European language family, which was originally spoken by tribes living in the area east of the Jutland peninsula in the west and west of Moscow and the Oka and Volga rivers basins in the east. One of the features of Baltic languages is the number of conservative or archaic features retained. Among the Baltic peoples are modern Lithuanians, Latvians (including Latgalians) – all Eastern Balts – as well as the Old Prussians, Yotvingians and Galindians – the Western Balts – whose people also survived, but their languages and cultures are now extinct, and are now being assimilated into the Eastern Baltic community.

==== Slavs ====
The Slavs are an Indo-European ethno-linguistic group living in Central Europe, Eastern Europe, Southeast Europe, North Asia and Central Asia, who speak the Indo-European Slavic languages, and share, to varying degrees, certain cultural traits and historical backgrounds. From the early 6th century they spread to inhabit most of Central and Eastern Europe and Southeast Europe. Slavic groups also ventured as far as Scandinavia, constituting elements amongst the Vikings; (Note: The origin of Rus. O Pritsak; 1981; pp 14, 27–28. Pritsak argues that the eastern Vikings – the Rus – were a social group of seafaring nomads which consisted of not only Scandinavians, but also Frisians, Balts, Slavs and Finns.) whilst at the other geographic extreme, Slavic mercenaries fighting for the Byzantines and Arabs settled Asia Minor and even as far as Syria. Later, East Slavs (specifically, Russians and Ukrainians) colonized Siberia and Central Asia. Every Slavic ethnicity has emigrated to other parts of the world. Over half of Europe's territory is inhabited by Slavic-speaking communities.

Modern nations and ethnic groups called by the ethnonym Slavs are considerably diverse both genetically and culturally, and relations between them – even within the individual ethnic groups themselves – are varied, ranging from a sense of connection to mutual feelings of hostility.

Present-day Slavic people are classified into East Slavic (chiefly Belarusians, Russians and Ukrainians), West Slavic (chiefly Poles, Czechs, Slovaks, Wends and Sorbs), and South Slavic (chiefly Bosniaks, Bulgarians, Croats, Goranis, Macedonians, Montenegrins, Serbs and Slovenes). For a more comprehensive list, see the ethnocultural subdivisions.

=== Balkan languages ===
==== Thracian and Dacian ====
===== Thracian =====
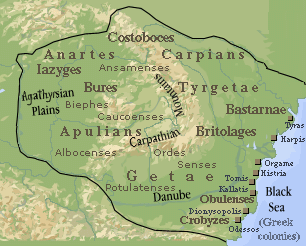
Dacia during the reign of Burebista

The Thracian language was the Indo-European language spoken in Southeast Europe by the Thracians, the northern neighbors of the Greeks. Some authors group Thracian and Dacian into a southern Baltic linguistic family. The Thracians inhabited a large area in southeastern Europe, including parts of the ancient provinces of Thrace, Moesia, Macedonia, Dacia, Scythia Minor, Sarmatia, Bithynia, Mysia, Pannonia, and other regions of the Balkans and Anatolia. This area extended over most of the Balkans region, and the Getae north of the Danube as far as beyond the Bug and including Panonia in the west.

The origins of the Thracians remain obscure, in the absence of written historical records. Evidence of proto-Thracians in the prehistoric period depends on artifacts of material culture. Leo Klejn identifies proto-Thracians with the multi-cordoned ware culture that was pushed away from Ukraine by the advancing timber grave culture. It is generally proposed that a proto-Thracian people developed from a mixture of indigenous peoples and Indo-Europeans from the time of Proto-Indo-European expansion in the Early Bronze Age when the latter, around 1500 BCE, mixed with indigenous peoples. We speak of proto-Thracians from which during the Iron Age (about 1000 BCE) Dacians and Thracians begin developing.

===== Dacian =====
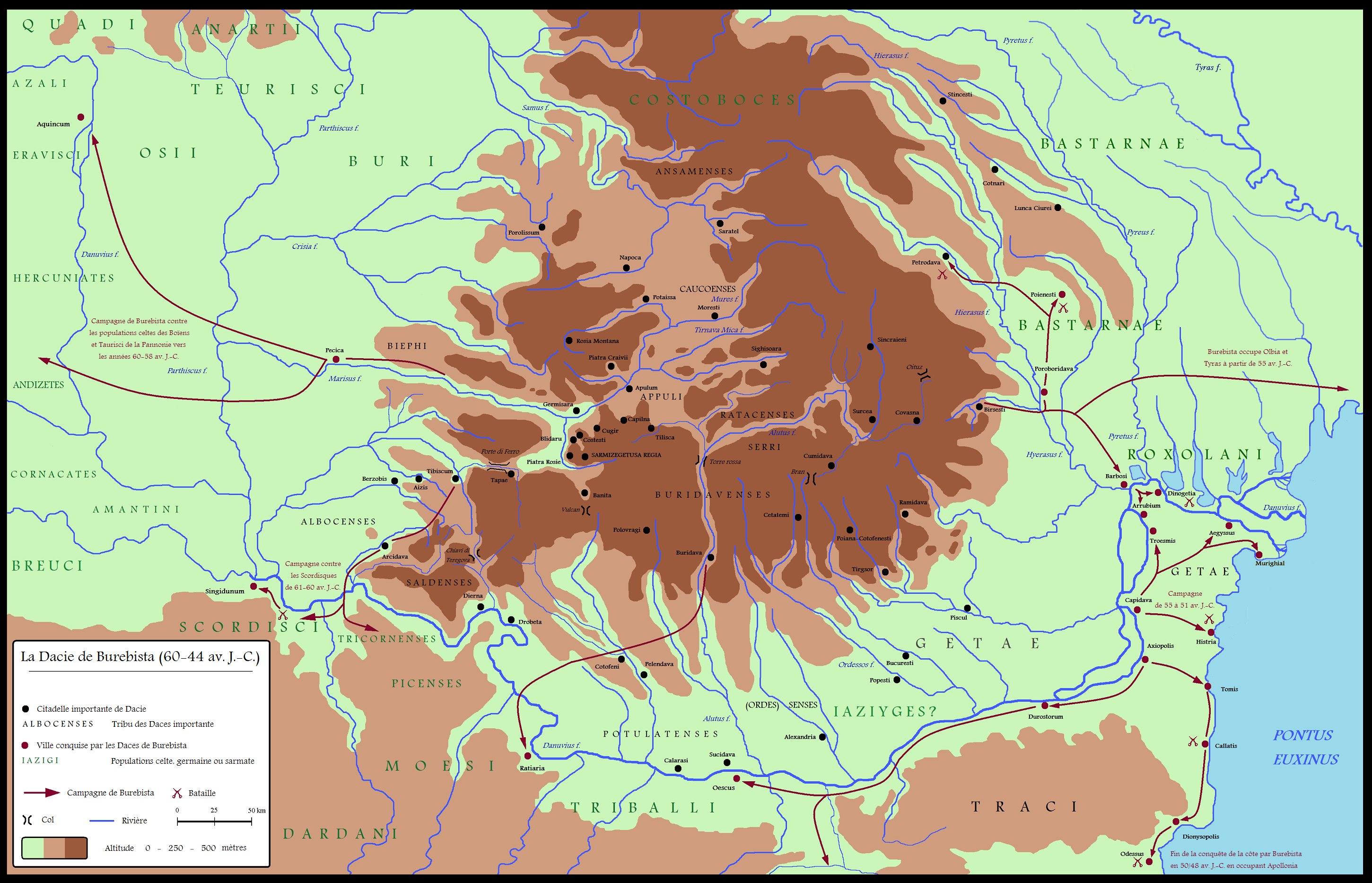
Map of Dacia, 1st century BCE

The Dacians (/ˈdeɪʃənz/; Latin: Daci, Ancient Greek: Δάκοι, Δάοι, Δάκαι) were an Indo-European people, part of or related to the Thracians. Dacians were the ancient inhabitants of Dacia, located in the area in and around the Carpathian Mountains and west of the Black Sea. This area includes the present-day countries of Romania and Moldova, as well as parts of Ukraine, Eastern Serbia, Northern Bulgaria, Slovakia, Hungary and Southern Poland.

The Dacians spoke the Dacian language, believed to have been closely related to Thracian, but were somewhat culturally influenced by the neighbouring Scythians and by the Celtic invaders of the 4th century BCE. The Dacians and Getae were always considered as Thracians by the ancients (Dio Cassius, Trogus Pompeius, Appian, Strabo and Pliny the Elder), and were both said to speak the same Thracian language.

Evidence of proto-Thracians or proto-Dacians in the prehistoric period depends on the remains of material culture. It is generally proposed that a proto-Dacian or proto-Thracian people developed from a mixture of indigenous peoples and Indo-Europeans from the time of Proto-Indo-European expansion in the Early Bronze Age (3,300–3,000 BCE) when the latter, around 1500 BCE, conquered the indigenous peoples. The indigenous people were Danubian farmers, and the invading people of the 3rd millennium BCE were Kurgan warrior-herders from the Ukrainian and Russian steppes.

Indo-Europeanization was complete by the beginning of the Bronze Age. The people of that time are best described as proto-Thracians, which later developed in the Iron Age into Danubian-Carpathian Geto-Dacians as well as Thracians of the eastern Balkan Peninsula.

==== Illyrian ====
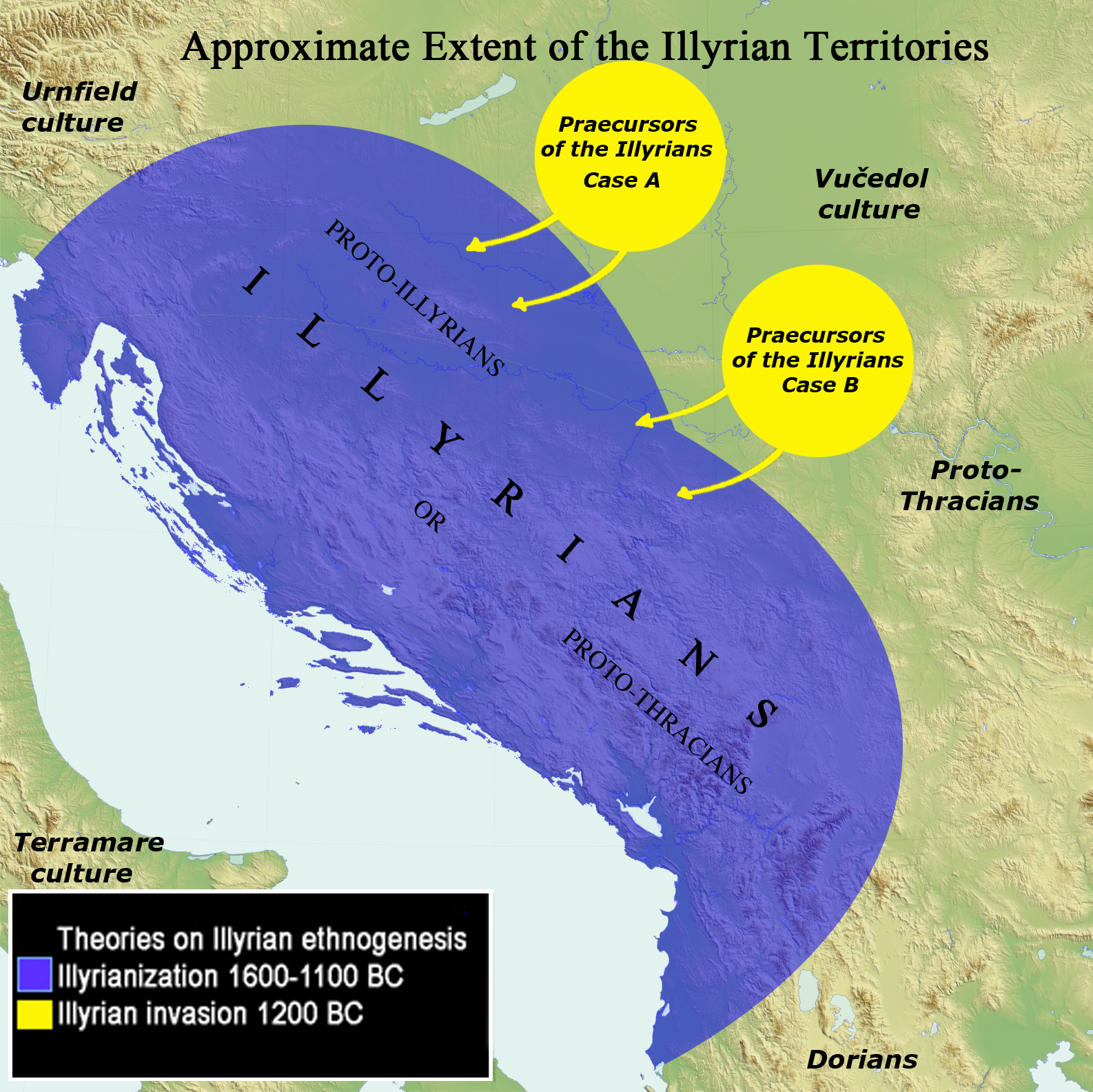
Ethnogenesis of the Illyrians

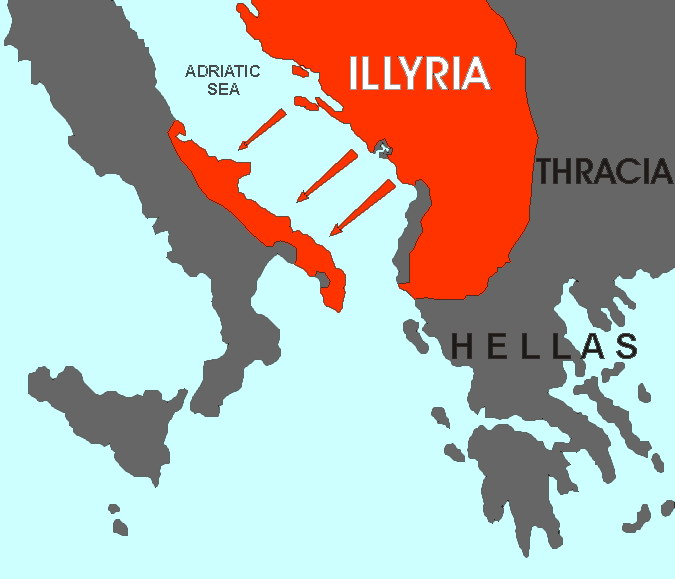
Illyrian colonisation of Italy, 9th century BCE

The Illyrians (Ancient Greek: Ἰλλυριοί, Illyrioi; Latin: Illyrii or Illyri) were a group of Indo-European tribes in antiquity, who inhabited part of the western Balkans and the southeastern coasts of the Italian Peninsula (Messapia). The territory the Illyrians inhabited came to be known as Illyria to Greek and Roman authors, who identified a territory that corresponds to the Croatia, Bosnia and Herzegovina, Slovenia, Montenegro, part of Serbia and most of Albania, between the Adriatic Sea in the west, the Drava river in the north, the Morava river in the east and the mouth of the Aoos river in the south. The first account of Illyrian peoples comes from the Periplus of Pseudo-Scylax, an ancient Greek text of the middle of the 4th century BCE that describes coastal passages in the Mediterranean.

These tribes, or at least a number of tribes considered "Illyrians proper", of which only small fragments are attested enough to classify as branches of Indo-European.

The name "Illyrians", as applied by the ancient Greeks to their northern neighbors, may have referred to a broad, ill-defined group of peoples, and it is today unclear to what extent they were linguistically and culturally homogeneous. The Illyrian tribes never collectively regarded themselves as 'Illyrians', and it is unlikely that they used any collective nomenclature for themselves. The name Illyrians seems to be the name applied to a specific Illyrian tribe, which was the first to come in contact with the ancient Greeks during the Bronze Age, causing the name Illyrians to be applied to all people of similar language and customs.

==== Albanian ====
Albanian (shqip [ʃcip] or gjuha shqipe [ˈɟuha ˈʃcipɛ], meaning Albanian language) is an Indo-European language spoken by approximately 7.4 million people, primarily in Albania, Kosovo, North Macedonia and Greece, but also in other areas of the Balkans in which there is an Albanian population, including Montenegro and Serbia (Presevo Valley). Centuries-old communities speaking Albanian-based dialects can be found scattered in Greece, southern Italy, Sicily, and Ukraine. As a result of a modern diaspora, there are also Albanian speakers elsewhere in those countries and in other parts of the world, including Scandinavia, Switzerland, Germany, Austria and Hungary, United Kingdom, Turkey, Australia, New Zealand, Netherlands, Singapore, Brazil, Canada, and the United States.

The earliest written document that mentions the Albanian language is a late 13th-century crime report from Dubrovnik. The first audio recording of the Albanian language was made by Norbert Jokl on 4 April 1914 in Vienna.

=== Armenian, Greek and Phrygian ===
==== Armenian ====
The Armenian language was first put into writing in 406 or 407AD when a priest known as Mesrop developed an Armenian alphabet.

There are three views amongst scholars about how speakers of Armenian came to be in what is now Armenia. One is that they came with the Phrygians from the west, and took over from the non-Indo-European speaking Urartians, who were previously dominant in this area. Another view is that the Armenian people came to speak an Indo-European language after originally speaking a Caucasian language. The third, and most prominent view is that the ancestor of the Armenian language was already spoken in the area during the time when it was politically dominated first by the Hittites, and later by the Urartians. The Hayasa-Azzi confederation is considered by some to have spoken Proto-Armenian.

A minority view also suggests that the Indo-European homeland may have been located in the Armenian Highland.

==== Hellenic Greek ====
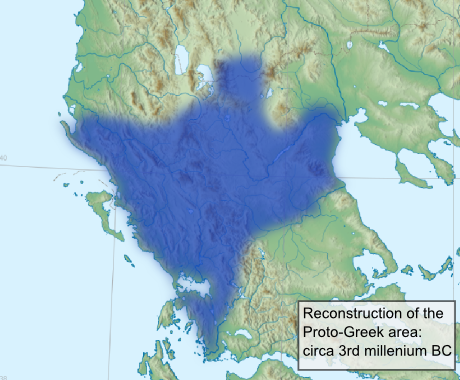
A reconstruction of the third-millennium BCE "Proto-Greek area", according to Bulgarian linguist Vladimir Georgiev.

Hellenic is the branch of the Indo-European language family that includes the different varieties of Greek. In traditional classifications, Hellenic consists of Greek alone, but some linguists group Greek together with various ancient languages thought to have been closely related or distinguish varieties of Greek that are distinct enough to be considered separate languages.

The Proto-Greeks, who spoke the predecessor of the Mycenaean language, are mostly placed in the Early Helladic period in Greece towards the end of the Neolithic in Southern Europe; proposed arrival dates include c. 3200 BCE and the early 3rd millennium BCE. In the late Neolithic, speakers of this dialect, which would become Proto-Greek, migrated from their homeland northeast of the Black Sea to the Balkans and into the Greek peninsula. The evolution of Proto-Greek could be considered within the context of an early Paleo-Balkan sprachbund that makes it difficult to delineate exact boundaries between individual languages. The characteristically Greek representation of word-initial laryngeals by prothetic vowels is shared, for one, by the Armenian language, which also seems to share some other phonological and morphological peculiarities of Greek; this has led some linguists to propose a hypothetically closer relationship between Greek and Armenian, although evidence remains scant.

==== Phrygian ====
Location of Phrygia in Anatolia

The Phrygians (gr. Φρύγες, Phrúges or Phrýges) were an ancient Indo-European people, who established their kingdom with a capital eventually at Gordium. It is presently unknown whether the Phrygians were actively involved in the collapse of the Hittite capital Hattusa or whether they simply moved into the vacuum left by the collapse of Hittite hegemony after the Late Bronze Age collapse.

The Phrygian language /ˈfrɪdʒiən/ was the language spoken by the Phrygians in Asia Minor during Classical Antiquity (c. 8th century BCE to 5th century CE). Phrygian is considered by some linguists to have been closely related to Greek. The similarity of some Phrygian words to Greek ones was observed by Plato in his Cratylus (410a). However, Eric P. Hamp suggests that Phrygian was related to Italo-Celtic in a hypothetical "Northwest Indo-European" group.

According to Herodotus, the Phrygians were initially dwelling in the southern Balkans under the name of Bryges (Briges), changing it to Phruges after their final migration to Anatolia, via the Hellespont. Though the migration theory is still defended by many modern historians, most archaeologists have abandoned the migration hypothesis regarding the origin of the Phrygians due to a lack substantial archaeological evidence, with the migration theory resting only on the accounts of Herodotus and Xanthus.

From tribal and village beginnings, the state of Phrygia arose in the eighth century BCE with its capital at Gordium. During this period, the Phrygians extended eastward and encroached upon the kingdom of Urartu, a former rival of the Hittites. Meanwhile, the Phrygian Kingdom was overwhelmed by Cimmerian invaders around 690 BCE, then briefly conquered by its neighbour Lydia, before it passed successively into the Persian Empire of Cyrus the Great and the empire of Alexander and his successors, was taken by the Attalids of Pergamon, and eventually became part of the Roman Empire. The last mention of the Phrygian language in literature dates to the fifth century CE and it was likely extinct by the seventh century.

== Indo-Iranian migrations ==
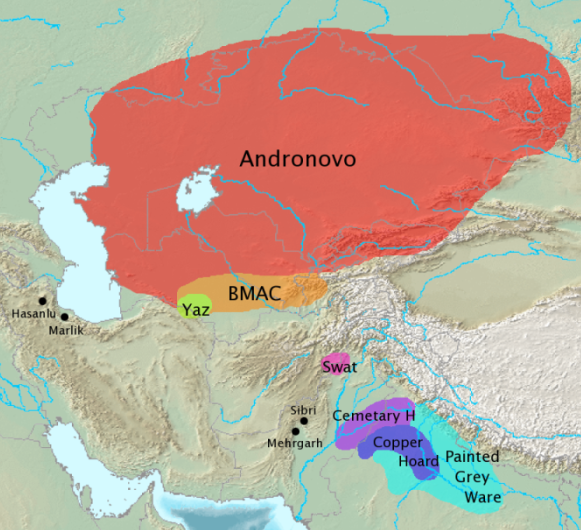
Archaeological cultures associated with the Indo-Iranian and Indo-Aryan migration: The Andronovo culture is regarded as the origin of the Indo-Iranians, who later interacted with the BMAC, from which they borrowed part of their distinctive religious beliefs. The Yaz culture is also associated with Indo-Iranian migrations. The Gandhara grave, Cemetery H, Copper Hoard and Painted Grey Ware cultures are associated with Indo-Aryan migrations (according to EIEC).

Indo-Iranian peoples are a grouping of ethnic groups consisting of the Indo-Aryan, Iranian, Dardic and Nuristani peoples; that is, speakers of Indo-Iranian languages, a major branch of the Indo-European language family.

The Proto-Indo-Iranians are commonly identified with the Sintashta culture and the subsequent Andronovo culture within the broader Andronovo horizon, and their homeland with an area of the Eurasian steppe that borders the Ural River on the west, the Tian Shan on the east.

The Indo-Iranians interacted with the Bactria-Margiana culture, also called "Bactria–Margiana Archaeological Complex". Proto-Indo-Iranian arose due to this influence. The Indo-Iranians also borrowed their distinctive religious beliefs and practices from this culture.

The Indo-Iranian migrations took place in two waves. The first wave consisted of the Indo-Aryan migration into the Levant and a migration south-eastward of the Vedic people, over the Hindu Kush into northern India. The Indo-Aryans split-off around 1800–1600 BCE from the Iranians, where-after they were defeated and split into two groups by the Iranians, who dominated the Central Eurasian steppe zone and "chased [the Indo-Aryans] to the extremities of Central Eurasia". Supposedly one group were the Indo-Aryans who founded the Mitanni kingdom around northern Syria; (c. 1500–1300 BCE) the other group were the Vedic people. Christopher I. Beckwith suggests that the Wusun, an Indo-European people of Inner Asia in antiquity, were also of Indo-Aryan origin.

The second wave is interpreted as the Iranian wave, and took place in the third stage of the Indo-European migrations from 800 BCE onwards.

=== Sintashta-Petrovka and Andronovo culture ===
==== Sintashta-Petrovka culture ====
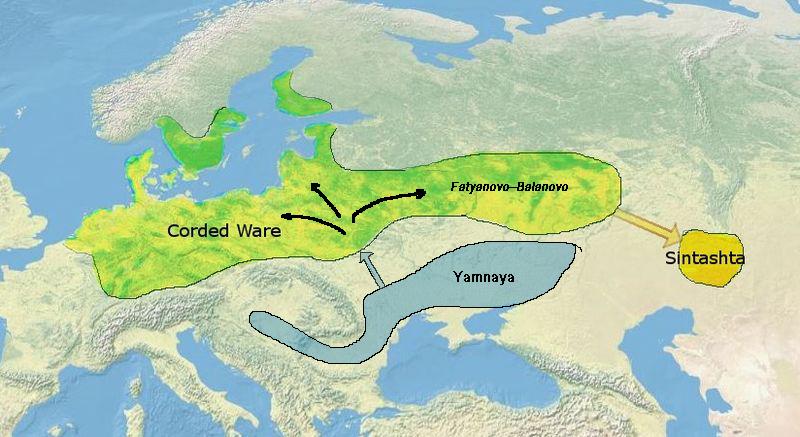
According to Allentoft (2015), the Sintashta culture probably derived from the Corded Ware Culture.

The Sintashta culture, also known as the Sintashta-Petrovka culture or Sintashta-Arkaim culture, is a Bronze Age archaeological culture of the northern Eurasian steppe on the borders of Eastern Europe and Central Asia, dated to the period 2100–1800 BCE. It is probably the archaeological manifestation of the Indo-Iranian language group.

The Sintashta culture emerged from the interaction of two antecedent cultures. Its immediate predecessor in the Ural-Tobol steppe was the Poltavka culture, an offshoot of the cattle-herding Yamnaya horizon that moved east into the region between 2800 and 2600 BCE. Several Sintashta towns were built over older Poltavka settlements or close to Poltavka cemeteries, and Poltavka motifs are common on Sintashta pottery. Sintashta material culture also shows the influence of the late Abashevo culture, a collection of Corded Ware settlements in the forest steppe zone north of the Sintashta region that were also predominantly pastoralist. Allentoft et al. (2015) also found close autosomal genetic relationship between peoples of Corded Ware culture and Sintashta culture.

The earliest known chariots have been found in Sintashta burials, and the culture is considered a strong candidate for the origin of the technology, which spread throughout the Old World and played an important role in ancient warfare. Sintashta settlements are also remarkable for the intensity of copper mining and bronze metallurgy carried out there, which is unusual for a steppe culture.

Because of the difficulty of identifying the remains of Sintashta sites beneath those of later settlements, the culture was only recently distinguished from the Andronovo culture. It is now recognised as a separate entity forming part of the 'Andronovo horizon'.

==== Andronovo culture ====
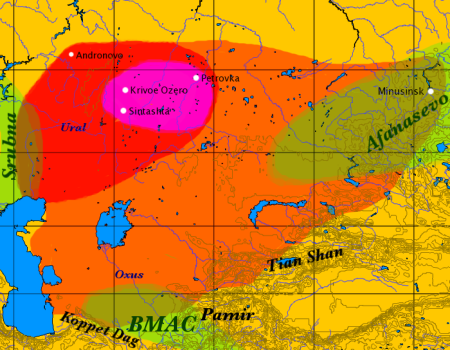
Map of the approximate maximal extent of the Andronovo culture. The formative Sintashta-Petrovka culture is shown in darker red. The location of the earliest spoke-wheeled chariot finds is indicated in purple. Adjacent and overlapping cultures (Afanasevo culture, Srubna culture, BMAC) are shown in green.

The Andronovo culture is a collection of similar local Bronze Age Indo-Iranian cultures that flourished c. 1800–900 BCE in western Siberia and the west Asiatic steppe. It is probably better termed an archaeological complex or archaeological horizon. The name derives from the village of Andronovo (55°53′N 55°42′E), where in 1914, several graves were discovered, with skeletons in crouched positions, buried with richly decorated pottery. The older Sintashta culture (2100–1800), formerly included within the Andronovo culture, is now considered separately, but regarded as its predecessor, and accepted as part of the wider Andronovo horizon. At least four sub-cultures of the Andronovo horizon have been distinguished, during which the culture expands towards the south and the east:

- Sintashta-Petrovka-Arkaim (Southern Urals, northern Kazakhstan, 2200–1600 BCE)
  - the Sintashta fortification of c. 1800 BCE in Chelyabinsk Oblast
  - the Petrovka settlement fortified settlement in Kazakhstan
  - the nearby Arkaim settlement dated to the 17th century
- Alakul (1800–1400 BCE) between Oxus and Jaxartes, Kyzylkum desert
  - Alekseyevka (1300–1100 BCE "final Bronze") in eastern Kazakhstan, contacts with Namazga VI in Turkmenia
  - Ingala Valley in the south of the Tyumen Oblast
- Fedorovo (1900–1400 BCE) in southern Siberia (earliest evidence of cremation and fire cult)
  - Beshkent–Vakhsh (1000–800 BCE)

The geographical extent of the culture is vast and difficult to delineate exactly. On its western fringes, it overlaps with the approximately contemporaneous, but distinct, Srubna culture in the Volga-Ural interfluvial. To the east, it reaches into the Minusinsk depression, with some sites as far west as the southern Ural Mountains, overlapping with the area of the earlier Afanasevo culture. Additional sites are scattered as far south as the Koppet Dag (Turkmenistan), the Pamir (Tajikistan) and the Tian Shan (Kyrgyzstan). The northern boundary vaguely corresponds to the beginning of the Taiga. In the Volga basin, interaction with the Srubna culture was the most intense and prolonged, and Federovo style pottery is found as far west as Volgograd.

Most researchers associate the Andronovo horizon with early Indo-Iranian languages, though it may have overlapped the early Uralic-speaking area at its northern fringe. According to Narasimhan et al. (2018), the expansion of the Andronovo culture towards the BMAC took place via the Inner Asia Mountain Corridor.

=== Bactria-Margiana culture ===
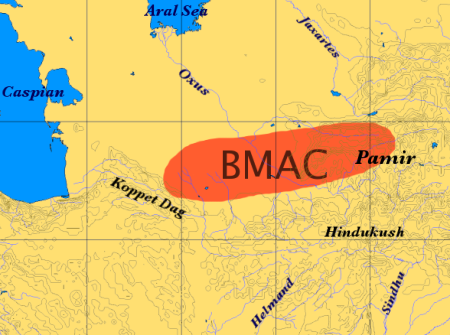
The extent of the BMAC (after EIEC)

The Bactria-Margiana culture, also called "Bactria-Margiana Archaeological Complex" (BMAC), was a non-Indo-European culture which influenced the Indo-European groups of the second stage of the Indo-European migrations. It was centered in what is nowadays northwestern Afghanistan and southern Turkmenistan, and had an elaborate trade-network reachings as far as the Indus civilisation, the Iranian plateau, and the Persian Gulf. Finds within BMAC sites include an Elamite-type cylinder seal and a Harappan seal stamped with an elephant and Indus script found at Gonur-depe.

Proto-Indo-Iranian arose due to this BMAC-influence. The Indo-Iranians also borrowed their distinctive religious beliefs and practices from this culture. According to Anthony, the Old Indic religion probably emerged among Indo-European immigrants in the contact zone between the Zeravshan River (present-day Uzbekistan) and (present-day) Iran. It was "a syncretic mixture of old Central Asian and new Indo-European elements", which borrowed "distinctive religious beliefs and practices" from the Bactria–Margiana culture. At least 383 non-Indo-European words were borrowed from this culture, including the god Indra and the ritual drink Soma.

=== Indo-Aryan migrations ===
==== Syria: Mitanni ====
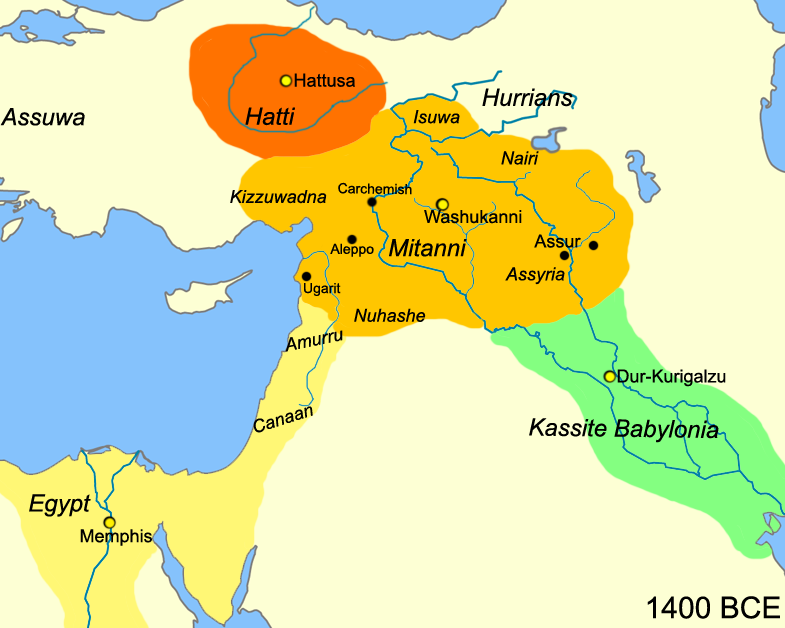
Map of the Near East, c. 1400 BCE, showing the Kingdom of Mitanni at its greatest extent

Mitanni (Hittite cuneiform KUR^{URU}Mi-ta-an-ni), also Mittani (Mi-it-ta-ni) or Hanigalbat (Assyrian Hanigalbat, Khanigalbat cuneiform Ḫa-ni-gal-bat) or Naharin in ancient Egyptian texts was a Hurrian (non-Indo-European)-speaking state in northern Syria and south-east Anatolia from c. 1500–1300 BCE. Mitanni came to be a regional power after the Hittite destruction of Amorite Babylon and a series of ineffectual Assyrian kings created a power vacuum in Mesopotamia. The capital of Mittanni was Washukanni, whose location has been determined by archaeologists to be on the headwaters of the Khabur River.

Although the Hurrian language is non-Indo-European, yet there are certain names and words found in the texts which suggest an Indo-Aryan influence. Among these are the names of gods (Indra, Mitra, Varuna, and Agni) and some personal names. There are also certain Indo-Aryan technical terms in a horse-training manual by a certain Kikkuli, dated to about 1400 BC. Several Mitanni rulers, such as Shattiwaza, had names which could be interpreted as Indo-Aryan. One explanation for this is that a militarily powerful, nomadic Indo-Aryan elite settled in Mitanni, and came to politically dominate the indigenous population.

==== India: Indo-Aryans ====
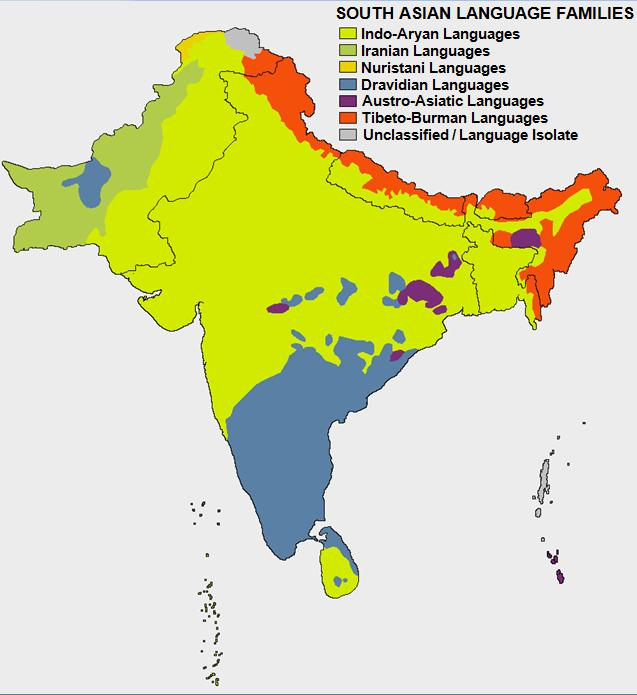
Language families in the Indian subcontinent

Spread of Vedic culture

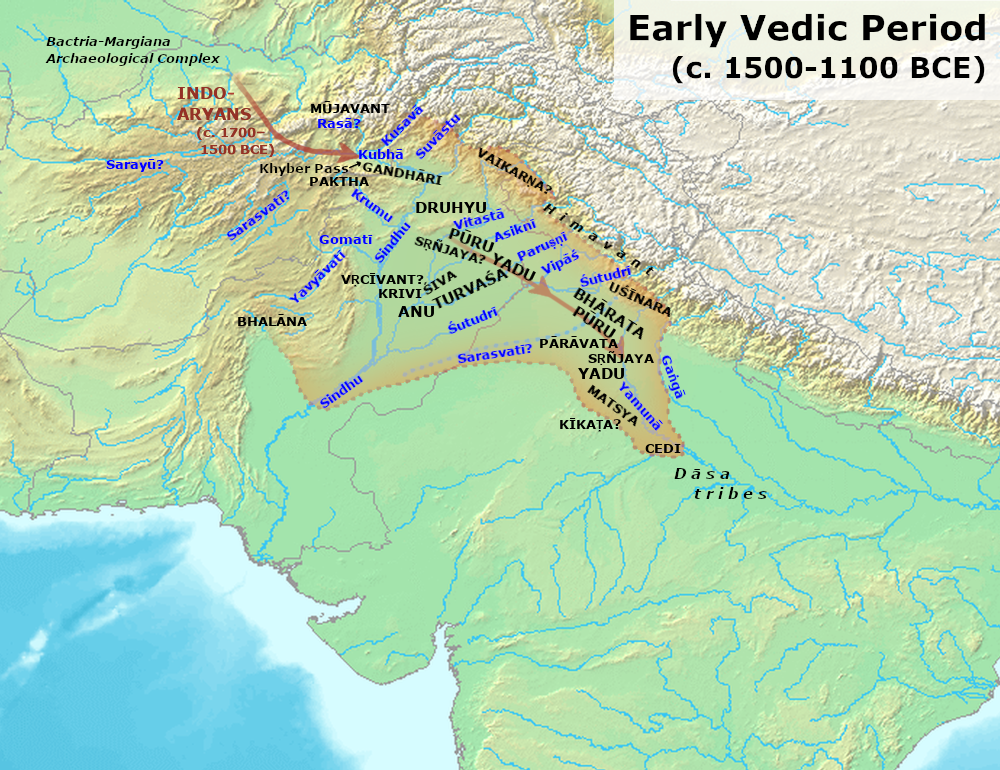
Early Vedic Period

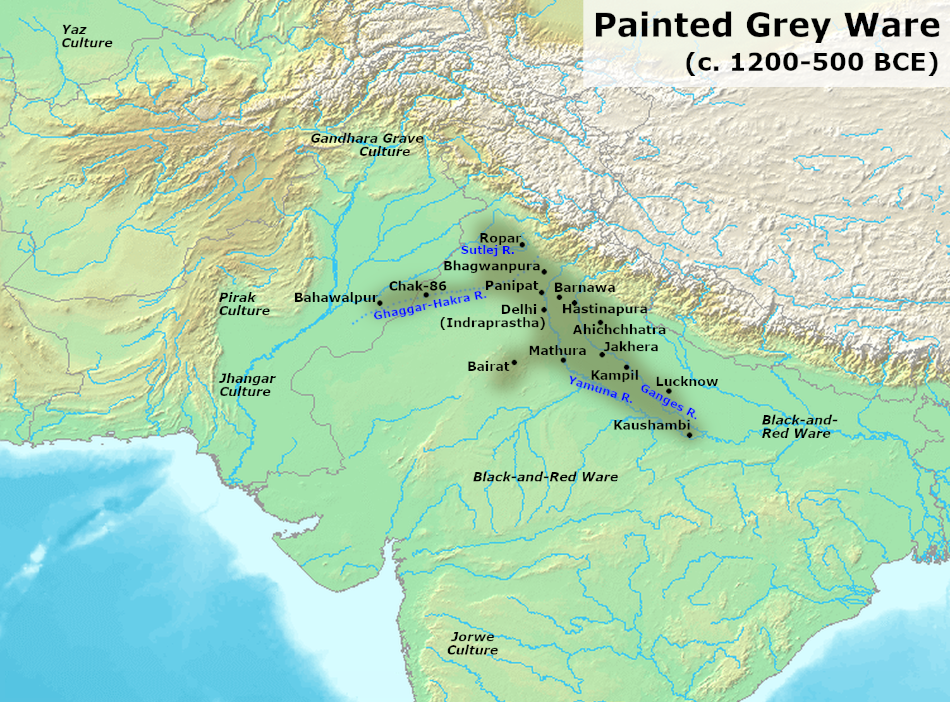
Painted Grey Ware culture (1200–600 BCE)

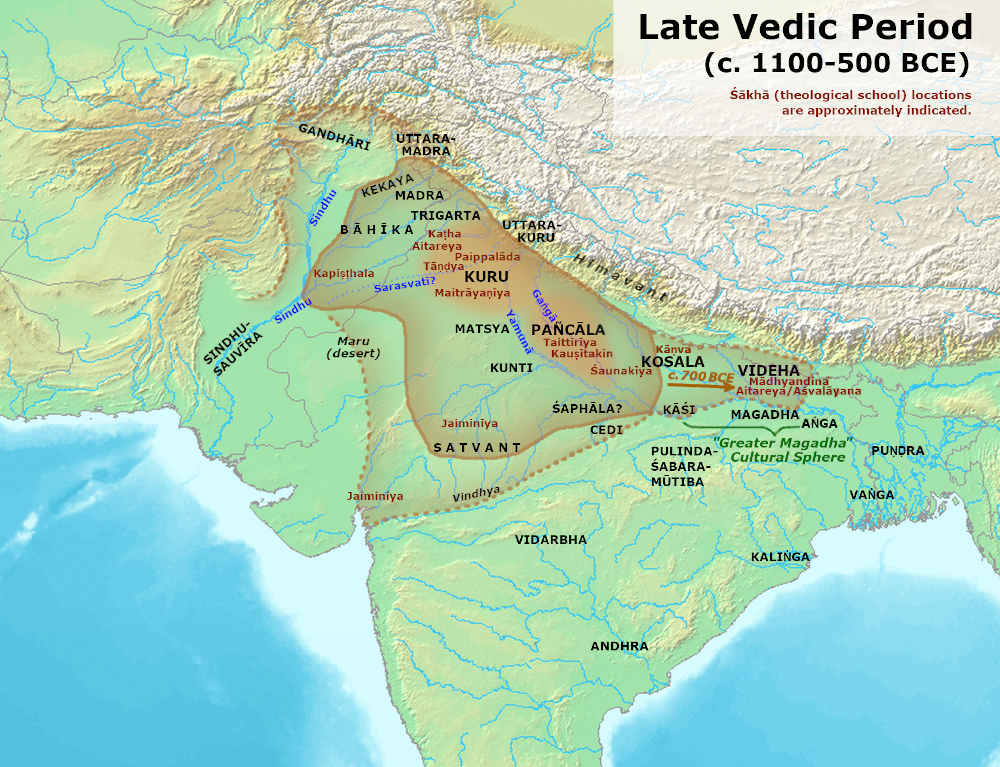
Kingdoms, tribes and theological schools of the Late Vedic Period

Mahajanapadas (c. 500 BCE)

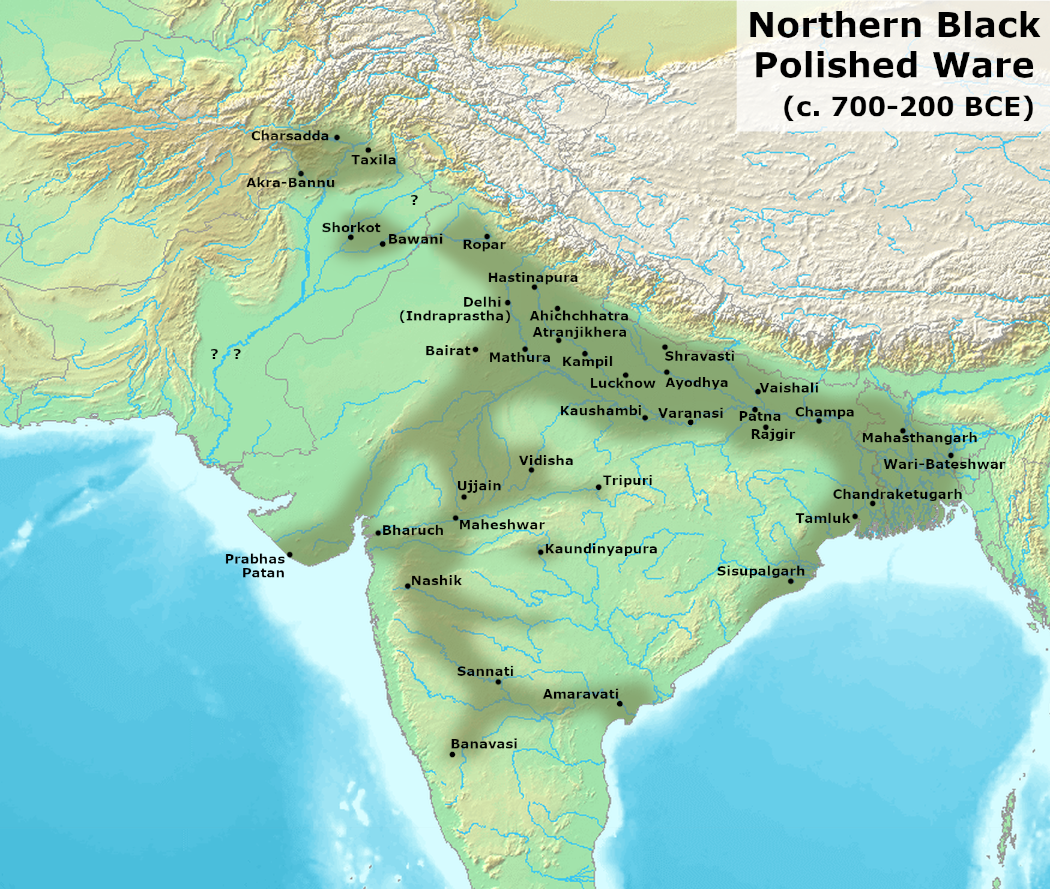
Northern Black Polished Ware culture (700–200 BCE)

The research on the Indo-Aryan migrations began with the study of the Rig Veda in the mid-19th century by Max Muller, and gradually evolved from a theory of a large scale invasion of a racially and technologically superior people to being a slow diffusion of small numbers of nomadic people that had a disproportionate societal impact on a large urban population. Contemporary claims of Indo-Aryan migrations are drawn from linguistic, archaeological, literary and cultural sources.

The Indo-Aryan migrations involved a number of tribes, who may have infiltrated northern India in series of "waves" of migration. Archaeological cultures identified with phases of Indo-Aryan culture include the Ochre Coloured Pottery culture, the Gandhara Grave culture, the Black and red ware culture and the Painted Grey Ware culture.

Parpola postulates a first wave of immigration from as early as 1900 BCE, corresponding to the Cemetery H culture and the Copper Hoard culture, c.q. Ochre Coloured Pottery culture, and an immigration to the Punjab c. 1700–1400 BCE. According to Kochhar there were three waves of Indo-Aryan immigration that occurred after the mature Harappan phase:

1. the "Murghamu" (Bactria-Margiana culture) related people who entered Balochistan at Pirak, Mehrgarh south cemetery, and other places, and later merged with the post-urban Harappans during the late Harappans Jhukar phase (2000–1800 BCE);
2. the Swat IV that co-founded the Harappan Cemetery H phase in Punjab (2000–1800 BCE);
3. and the Rigvedic Indo-Aryans of Swat V that later absorbed the Cemetery H people and gave rise to the Painted Grey Ware culture (PGW) (to 1400 BCE).

The Vedic Indo-Aryans started to migrate into northwestern India around 1500 BCE, as a slow diffusion during the Late Harappan period, establishing the Vedic religion during the Vedic period (c. 1500–500 BCE). The associated culture was initially a tribal, pastoral society centred in the northwestern parts of the Indian subcontinent; it spread after 1200 BCE to the Ganges Plain, as it was shaped by increasing settled agriculture, a hierarchy of four social classes, and the emergence of monarchical, state-level polities.

The end of the Vedic period witnessed the rise of large, urbanized states as well as of shramana movements (including Jainism and Buddhism) which opposed and challenged the expanding Vedic orthodoxy. Around the beginning of the Common Era, the Vedic tradition formed one of the main constituents of the so-called "Hindu synthesis"

==== Inner Asia: Wusun ====
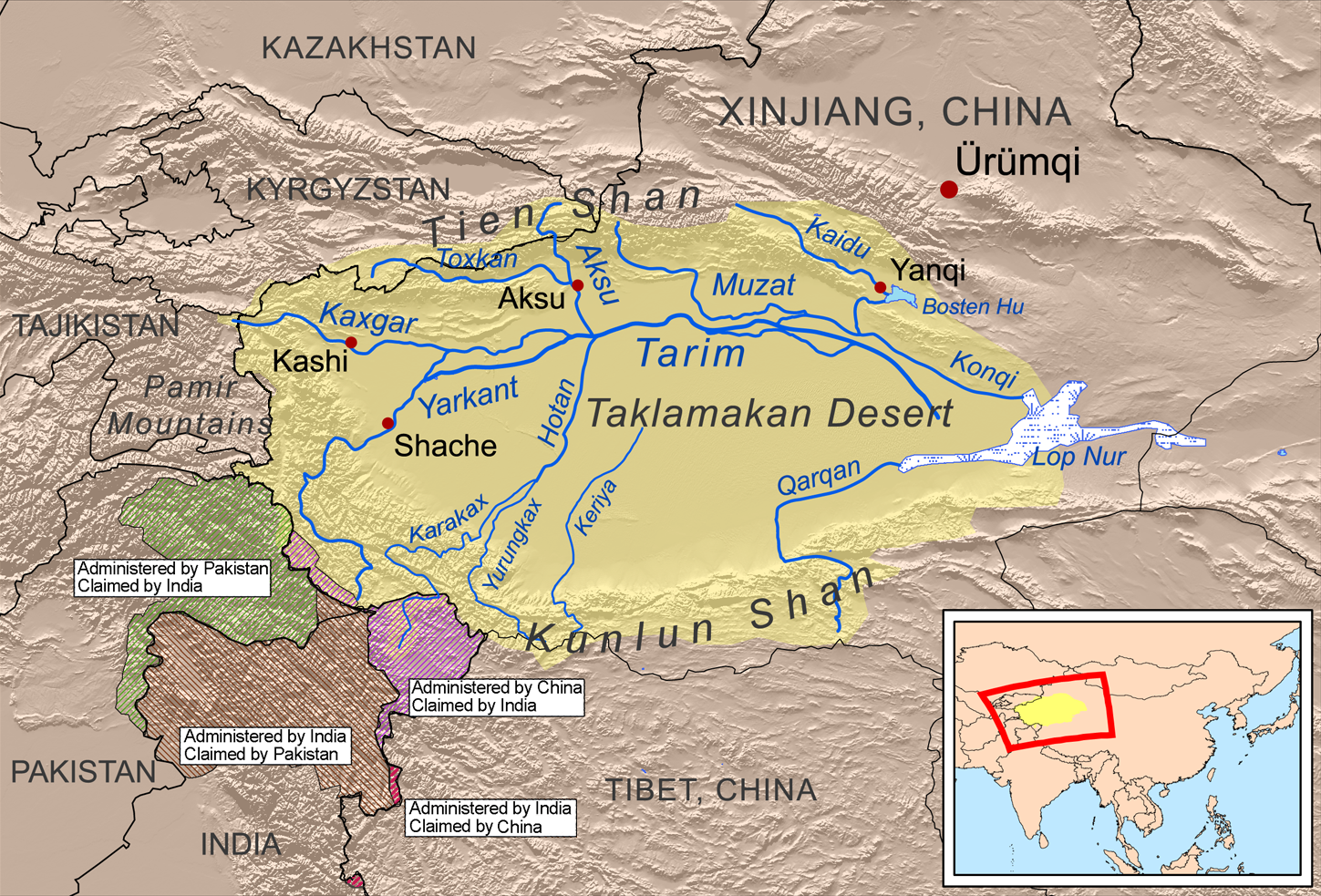
The Tarim Basin, 2008

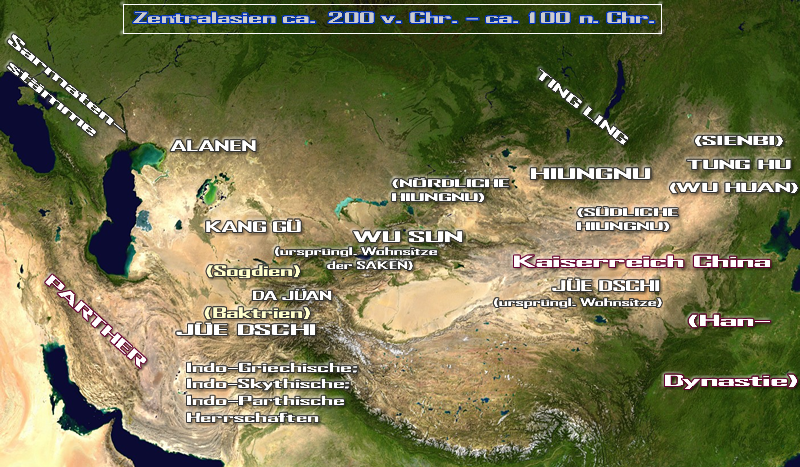
Wusun and their neighbours during the late 2nd century BCE, take note that the Yancai did not change their name to Alans until the 1st century.

According to Christopher I. Beckwith the Wusun, an Indo-European people of Inner Asia in antiquity, were also of Indo-Aryan origin. From the Chinese term Wusun, Beckwith reconstructs the Old Chinese *âswin, which he compares to the Old Indo-Aryan aśvin "the horsemen", the name of the Rigvedic twin equestrian gods. Beckwith suggests that the Wusun were an eastern remnant of the Indo-Aryans, who had been suddenly pushed to the extremities of the Eurasian Steppe by the Iranian peoples in the 2nd millennium BCE.

The Wusun are first mentioned by Chinese sources as vassals in the Tarim Basin of the Yuezhi, another Indo-European people of possible Tocharian stock. Around 175 BCE, the Yuezhi were utterly defeated by the Xiongnu, also former vassals of the Yuezhi. The Yuezhi subsequently attacked the Wusun and killed their king (Kunmo Chinese: 昆莫 or Kunmi Chinese: 昆彌) Nandoumi (Chinese: 難兜靡), capturing the Ili Valley from the Saka (Scythians) shortly afterwards. In return the Wusun settled in the former territories of the Yuezhi as vassals of the Xiongnu.

The son of Nandoumi was adopted by the Xiongnu king and made leader of the Wusun. Around 130 BCE he attacked and utterly defeated the Yuezhi, settling the Wusun in the Ili Valley.

After the Yuezhi were defeated by the Xiongnu, in the 2nd century BCE, a small group, known as the Little Yuezhi, fled to the south, while the majority migrated west to the Ili Valley, where they displaced the Sakas (Scythians). Driven from the Ili Valley shortly afterwards by the Wusun, the Yuezhi migrated to Sogdia and then Bactria, where they are often identified with the Tokhárioi (Τοχάριοι) and Asioi of Classical sources. They then expanded into northern South Asia, where one branch of the Yuezhi founded the Kushan Empire. The Kushan empire stretched from Turfan in the Tarim Basin to Pataliputra on the Gangetic plain at its greatest extent, and played an important role in the development of the Silk Road and the transmission of Buddhism to China.

Soon after 130 BCE the Wusun became independent of the Xiongnu, becoming trusted vassals of the Han Dynasty and powerful force in the region for centuries. With the emerging steppe federations of the Rouran, the Wusun migrated into the Pamir Mountains in the 5th century CE. They are last mentioned in 938 when a Wusun chieftain paid tribute to the Liao dynasty.

==== Mesopotamia – Kassites ====
The Kassite language was not Indo-European. However, the appearance of the Kassites in Mesopotamia in the 18th century BCE has been connected to the contemporary Indo-European expansion into the region at the time.

The Kassites gained control of Babylonia after the Hittite sack of the city in 1595 BCE (i.e. 1531 BCE per the short chronology), and established a dynasty based in Dur-Kurigalzu. The Kassites were members of a small military aristocracy but were efficient rulers and not locally unpopular. The horse, which the Kassites worshipped, first came into use in Babylonia at this time. The Kassites were polytheistic, and the name of some 30 gods are known.

The Kassite language has not been classified. Genetic relations of the Kassite language are unclear, although it is generally agreed that it was not Semitic; relation with Elamite is doubtful. Relationship with or membership in the Hurro-Urartian family has been suggested, being possibly related to it, based on a number of words. However, several Kassite leaders bore Indo-European names, and the Kassites worshipped several Indo-Aryan gods, suggesting that the Kassites were under significant Indo-European influence. The reign of the Kassites laid the essential groundwork for the development of subsequent Babylonian culture.

=== Iranians ===
==== Iranian plateau ====
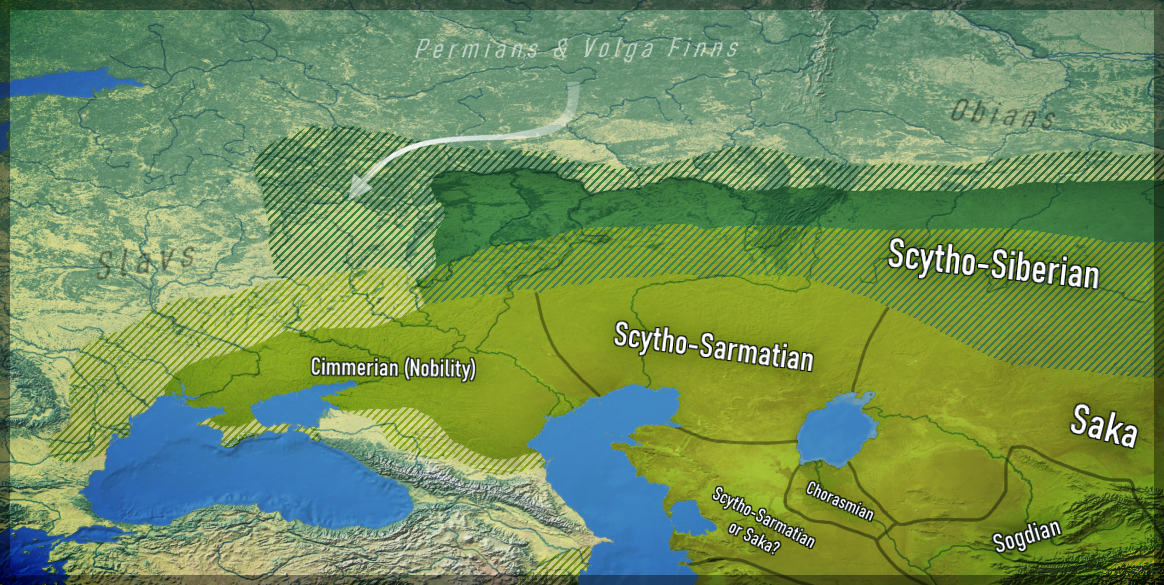
Distribution of Iranic peoples in Central Asia and the Iranian plateau during the Iron Age period.

The Iranian peoples (Note: R.N Frye, "IRAN v. PEOPLE OF IRAN" in Encyclopedia Iranica. "In the following discussion of 'Iranian peoples', the term 'Iranian' may be understood in two ways. It is, first of all, a linguistic classification, intended to designate any society which inherited or adopted, and transmitted, an Iranian language. The set of Iranian-speaking peoples is thus considered a kind of unity, in spite of their distinct lineage identities plus all the factors which may have further differentiated any one group's sense of self.") (also known as Iranic peoples to avoid confusion) are an Indo-European ethno-linguistic group that comprise the speakers of Iranian languages. Their historical areas of settlement were on the Iranian plateau (mainly Iran, Azerbaijan and Afghanistan) and certain neighbouring areas of Asia (such as parts of the Caucasus, Eastern Turkey, Northeast Syria, Uzbekistan, Tajikistan, Bahrain, Oman, northern Iraq, Northwestern and Western Pakistan) reflecting changing geopolitical range of the Persian empires and the Iranian history.

The Medes, Parthians and Persians begin to appear on the western Iranian plateau from c. 800 BCE, after which they remained under Assyrian rule for several centuries, as it was with the rest of the peoples in the Near East. The Achaemenids replaced Median rule from 559 BCE. Around the first millennium CE, the Kambojas, the Pashtuns and the Baloch began to settle on the eastern edge of the Iranian plateau, on the mountainous frontier of northwestern and western Pakistan, displacing the earlier Indo-Aryans from the area.

Their current distribution spreads across the Iranian plateau, and stretches from the Caucasus in the north to the Persian Gulf in the south, and from the Indus River in the east to eastern Turkey in the west – a region that is sometimes called the "Iranian cultural continent", or Greater Iran by some scholars, and represents the extent of the Iranian languages and significant influence of the Iranian peoples, through the geopolitical reach of the Iranian empire.

The Iranians comprise the present day Persians, Lurs, Ossetians, Kurds, Pashtuns, Balochs, Tajiks and their sub-groups of the historic Medes, Massagetaes, Sarmatians, Scythians, Parthians, Alans, Bactrians, Soghdians and other people of Central Asia, the Caucasus and the Iranian plateau. Another possible group are the Cimmerians who are mostly supposed to have been related to either Iranian or Thracian speaking groups, or at least to have been ruled by an Iranian elite.

==== Scythians ====
Territories (full line) and expansion (dotted line) of the Indo-Scythians Kingdom at its greatest extent

The first Iranians to reach the Black Sea may have been the Cimmerians in the 8th century BCE, although their linguistic affiliation is uncertain. They were followed by the Scythians, who would dominate the area, at their height, from the Carpathian Mountains in the west, to the easternmost fringes of Central Asia in the east, including the Indo-Scythian Kingdom in India. For most of their existence, they were based in what is modern-day Ukraine and southern European Russia.

Sarmatian tribes, of whom the best known are the Roxolani (Rhoxolani), Iazyges (Jazyges) and the Alani (Alans), followed the Scythians westwards into Europe in the late centuries BCE and the 1st and 2nd centuries of the Common Era (The Age of Migrations). The populous Sarmatian tribe of the Massagetae, dwelling near the Caspian Sea, were known to the early rulers of Persia in the Achaemenid Period. In the east, the Saka occupied several areas in Xinjiang, from Khotan to Tumshuq.

==== Decline in central Asia ====
In Central Asia, the Turkic languages have marginalized Iranian languages as a result of the Turkic expansion of the early centuries CE. In Eastern Europe, Slavic and Germanic peoples assimilated and absorbed the native Iranian languages (Scythian and Sarmatian) of the region. Extant major Iranian languages are Persian, Pashto, Kurdish, and Balochi, besides numerous smaller ones.

== Alternative hypotheses ==
=== Paleolithic Continuity Paradigm ===
The "Paleolithic Continuity Paradigm" is a hypothesis suggesting that the Proto-Indo-European language (PIE) can be traced back to the Upper Paleolithic, several millennia earlier than the Chalcolithic or at the most Neolithic estimates in other scenarios of Proto-Indo-European origins. Its main proponents are Marcel Otte, Alexander Häusler, and Mario Alinei.

The PCT posits that the advent of Indo-European languages should be linked to the arrival of Homo sapiens in Europe and Asia from Africa in the Upper Paleolithic. Employing "lexical periodization", Alinei arrives at a timeline deeper than even that of Colin Renfrew's Anatolian hypothesis. (Note: Mario Alinei (with reference to Francisco Villar, Los indoeuropeos y los orígines de Europa. Lenguaje y historia, Gredos, Madrid 1991): "The sharp, and now at last admitted even by traditionalists (Villar 1991) differentiation of farming terminology in the different IE languages, while absolutely unexplainable in the context of Renfrew's NDT, provides yet another fundamental proof that the differentiation of IE languages goes back to remote prehistory.")

Since 2004, an informal workgroup of scholars who support the Paleolithic Continuity hypothesis has been held online. Apart from Alinei himself, its leading members (referred to as "Scientific Committee" in the website) are linguists Xaverio Ballester (University of Valencia) and Francesco Benozzo (University of Bologna). Also included are prehistorian Marcel Otte (Université de Liège) and anthropologist Henry Harpending (University of Utah).

It is not listed by Mallory among the proposals for the origins of the Indo-European languages that are widely discussed and considered credible within academia.

=== Indian origins ===
The notion of "indigenous Aryans" posits that speakers of Indo-Aryan languages are "indigenous" to the Indian subcontinent. Scholars like Jim G. Shaffer and B. B. Lal note the absence of archaeological remains of an Aryan "conquest", and the high degree of physical continuity between Harappan and Post-Harappan society. They support the controversial hypothesis that the Indo-Aryan civilization was not introduced by Aryan migrations, but originated in pre-Vedic India.

In recent years, the concept of "indigenous Aryans" has been increasingly conflated with an "Out of India" origin of the Indo-European language family. This contrasts with the model of Indo-Aryan migration which posits that Indo-Aryan tribes migrated to India from Central Asia. Some furthermore claim that all Indo-European languages originated in India. (Note: Bryant: "It must be stated immediately that there is an unavoidable corollary of an Indigenist position. If the Indo-Aryan languages did not come from outside South Asia, this necessarily entails that India was the original homeland of all the other Indo-European languages.") Support for the Out of India theory IAT mostly exists among a subset of Indian scholars, playing a significant role in Hindutva politics, (Note: Wendy Doniger (2017), "Another Great Story", review of Asko Parpola's The Roots of Hinduism; in: Inference, International Review of Science, Volume 3, Issue 2) (Note: Girish Shahane (Sep 14, 2019), Why Hindutva supporters love to hate the discredited Aryan Invasion Theory, Scroll.in) but has no relevance, let alone support, in mainstream scholarship. (Note: No support in mainstream scholarship: Thapar (2006): "there is no scholar at this time seriously arguing for the indigenous origin of Aryans."; Wendy Doniger (2017): "The opposing argument, that speakers of Indo-European languages were indigenous to the Indian subcontinent, is not supported by any reliable scholarship. It is now championed primarily by Hindu nationalists, whose religious sentiments have led them to regard the theory of Aryan migration with some asperity."; Girish Shahane (Sep 14, 2019), in response to Narasimhan et al. (2019): "Hindutva activists, however, have kept the Aryan Invasion Theory alive, because it offers them the perfect strawman, "an intentionally misrepresented proposition that is set up because it is easier to defeat than an opponent's real argument" [...] The Out of India hypothesis is a desperate attempt to reconcile linguistic, archaeological and genetic evidence with Hindutva sentiment and nationalistic pride, but it cannot reverse time's arrow [...] The evidence keeps crushing Hindutva ideas of history."; Jamison (2006): "...the Indo-Aryan "controversy" [...] is essentially a religio-nationalistic attack on a scholarly consensus.; Erdosy (2012, p. x): "The indigenist position is part of a "lunatic fringe"."; Koenraad Elst (May 10, 2016), Koenraad Elst: "I am not aware of any governmental interest in correcting distorted history", Swarajya Magazine: "Of course it is a fringe theory, at least internationally, where the Aryan Invasion Theory (AIT) is still the official paradigm. In India, though, it has the support of most archaeologists, who fail to find a trace of this Aryan influx and instead find cultural continuity.")

== See also ==
- Proto-Indo-Europeans
- Western Steppe Herders
- Haplogroup R1a
- Haplogroup R1b
- Genetic history of Europe
- Pre-modern human migration

== Notes ==
Subnotes

== Sources ==
Printed sources

- Allentoft; Sikora; et al. (2015), "Population genomics of Bronze Age Eurasia", Nature, 522 (7555): 167–172, Bibcode:2015Natur.522..167A, doi:10.1038/nature14507, PMID 26062507, S2CID 4399103
- Anthony, David (1995). "Nazi and eco-feminist prehistories: ideology and empiricism in Indo-European archaeology". Nationalism, politics, and the practice of archaeology. Cambridge: Cambridge University Press. ISBN 978-0-521-55839-6.
- Anthony, David W. (2007), The Horse The Wheel And Language. How Bronze-Age Riders From the Eurasian Steppes Shaped The Modern World, Princeton University Press
- Anthony, David; Ringe, Don (2015), "The Indo-European Homeland from Linguistic and Archaeological Perspectives", Annual Review of Linguistics, 1: 199–219, doi:10.1146/annurev-linguist-030514-124812
- Anthony, David (2017), "Archaeology and Language: Why Archaeologists Care About the Indo-European Problem", in Crabtree, P. J.; Bogucki, P. (eds.), European Archaeology as Anthropology: Essays in Memory of Bernard Wailes, University of Pennsylvania Press
- Anthony, D. W. (2019), "Archaeology, Genetics, and Language in the Steppes: A Comment on Bomhard", Journal of Indo-European Studies, pp. 1–23
- Anthony, David (2020), "Ancient DNA, Mating Networks, and the Anatolian Split", in Serangeli, Matilde; Olander, Thomas (eds.), Dispersals and Diversification: Linguistic and Archaeological Perspectives on the Early Stages of Indo-European, Brill
- Basu; Mukherjee, Namita; Roy, Sangita; Sengupta, Sanghamitra; Banerjee, Sanat; Chakraborty, Madan; Dey, Badal; Roy, Monami; Roy, Bidyut; Bhattacharyya, Nitai P.; Roychoudhury, Susanta; Majumder, Partha P. (2003), "Ethnic India: A Genomic View, With Special Reference to Peopling and Structure", Genome Research, 13 (10): 2277–2290, doi:10.1101/gr.1413403, PMC 403703, PMID 14525929
- Beckwith, Christopher I. (16 March 2009), Empires of the Silk Road: A History of Central Eurasia from the Bronze Age to the Present, Princeton University Press, ISBN 978-1-400-82994-1
- Boardman, John (1982), The Cambridge Ancient History: The Prehistory of the Balkans; the Middle East and the Aegean World, Tenth to Eighth Centuries B.C., vol. III:1, Cambridge University Press, ISBN 978-0-521-22496-3
- Boardman, John; Hammond, Nicholas Geoffrey Lemprière (1982), The Cambridge Ancient History: The Expansion of the Greek World, Eighth to Six Centuries B.C, Cambridge University Press, ISBN 978-0-521-23447-4
- Bojtár, Endre (1999), Foreword to the Past: A Cultural History of the Baltic People, Central European University Press, ISBN 978-9-639-11642-9
- Bomhard, Allan (2019), "The Origins of Proto-Indo-European: The Caucasian Substrate Hypothesis", Journal of Indo-European Studies, vol. 47, no. 1–2
- Bradley, Richard (2007), The Prehistory of Britain and Ireland, Cambridge University Press, ISBN 978-0-521-84811-4
- Bresnan, Patrick S. (2017), Awakening: An Introduction to the History of Eastern Thought (6th ed.), Routledge
- Bryant, Edwin (2001), The Quest for the Origins of Vedic Culture: The Indo-Aryan Migration Debate, Oxford University Press, ISBN 978-0-195-13777-4
- Bryant, Edwin F.; Patton, Laurie L. (2005), The Indo-Aryan Controversy: Evidence and Inference in Indian History, Routledge
- Burrow, T. (1973), "The Proto-Indoaryans", Journal of the Royal Asiatic Society of Great Britain and Ireland, 105 (2): 123–140, doi:10.1017/S0035869X00130837, JSTOR 25203451, S2CID 162454265
- Callaway, Ewen (12 February 2015), "European languages linked to migration from the east. Large ancient-DNA study uncovers population that moved westwards 4,500 years ago", Nature, doi:10.1038/nature.2015.16919, S2CID 184180681
- Clackson, James (1995), The Linguistic Relationship Between Armenian and Greek, Oxford: Wiley-Blackwell, ISBN 978-0-631-19197-1
- Coleman, John E. (2000), "An Archaeological Scenario for the 'Coming of the Greeks' ca. 3200 B.C.", The Journal of Indo-European Studies, vol. 28, no. 1–2, pp. 101–153
- Damgaard, Peter de Barros (2018), "The First Horse herders and the Impact of Early Bronze Age Steppe expansions into Asia", Science, 360 (6396) eaar7711, Bibcode:2018Sci...360r7711D, doi:10.1126/science.aar7711, PMC 6748862, PMID 29743352
- Demkina, T. S. (2017), "Paleoecological Crisis in the Steppes of the Lower Volga Region in the Middle of the Bronze Age (III–II centuries BC)", Eurasian Soil Science, 50 (7): 791–804, Bibcode:2017EurSS..50..791D, doi:10.1134/S1064229317070018, S2CID 133638705
- Diakonoff, Igor M. (1995), "Two Recent Studies of Indo-Iranian Origins", Journal of the American Oriental Society, 115 (3), American Oriental Society: 473–477, doi:10.2307/606224, JSTOR 606224
- Dumitrescu, Vlad; Boardman, John; Hammond, N. G. L; Kollberger, E (1982), "The prehistory of Romania from the earliest times to 1000 BC", The Prehistory of the Balkans, the Middle East and the Aegean World, Tenth to Eighth Centuries BC, The Cambridge Ancient History, Cambridge University Press, ISBN 978-0-521-22496-3
- Ellis, Robert (1861), The Armenian Origin of the Etruscans, Parker, Son and Bourn
- Enoki, K.; Koshelenko, G. A. [in Russian]; Haidary, Z. (1994), "The Yu'eh-chih and their migrations" (PDF), in Harmatta, János (ed.), History of Civilizations of Central Asia: The Development of Sedentary and Nomadic Civilizations, 700 B. C. to A. D. 250, Paris: UNESCO, pp. 165–184, ISBN 978-9-231-02846-5
- Erdosy (2012), The Indo-Aryans of Ancient South Asia: Language, Material Culture and Ethnicity, Walter de Gruyter, ISBN 978-3-110-81643-3
- Flood, Gavin D. (1996), An Introduction to Hinduism, Cambridge University Press
- Fortson, IV, Benjamin W. (2011), Indo-European Language and Culture: An Introduction, John Wiley & Sons, ISBN 978-1-444-35968-8
- Fosse, Lars Martin (2005), "Aryan Past and Post-colonial Present: The Polemics and Politics of Indigenous Aryanism", in Bryant, Edwin; Patton, Laurie L. (eds.), The Indo-Aryan Controversy: Evidence and Inference in Indian History, Routledge
- Frazee, Charles A. (1997), World History: Ancient and Medieval Times to A.D. 1500, Barron's Educational Series, ISBN 978-0-812-09765-8
- Furtwängler, Anja; et al. (2020), "Ancient genomes reveal social and genetic structure of Late Neolithic Switzerland", Nature Communications, 11 (1) 1915, Bibcode:2020NatCo..11.1915F, doi:10.1038/s41467-020-15560-x, PMC 7171184, PMID 32313080, S2CID 215819621
- Georgiev, Vladimir Ivanov (1981), Introduction to the History of the Indo-European Languages, Sofia: Bulgarian Academy of Sciences, ISBN 978-9-535-17261-1
- Gimbutas, Marija (1997), Dexter, Miriam Robbins; Jones-Bley, Karlene (eds.), The Kurgan Culture and the Indo-Europeanization of Europe: Selected Articles From 1952 to 1993, Journal of Indo-European Studies Monograph Series, vol. 18, Institute for the Study of Man, ISBN 978-0-941-69456-8
- Grigoriev, Stanislav (2002). "Ancient Indo-Europeans". Chelyabinsk. Rifei.
- Grolle, Johann (12 May 2018), "Invasion aus der Steppe", Der Spiegel
- Haak, Wolfgang (2015), "Massive migration from the steppe was a source for Indo-European languages in Europe", Nature, 522 (7555): 207–211, arXiv:1502.02783, Bibcode:2015Natur.522..207H, doi:10.1038/nature14317, PMC 5048219, PMID 25731166
- Haak, W.; Lazaridis, I.; Patterson, N.; Rohland, N.; Mallick, S.; Llamas, B.; Brandt, G.; Nordenfelt, S.; Harney, E.; Stewardson, K.; Fu, Q.; Mittnik, A.; Bánffy, E.; Economou, C.; Francken, M.; Friederich, S.; Pena, R. G.; Hallgren, F.; Khartanovich, V.; Khokhlov, A.; Kunst, M.; Kuznetsov, P.; Meller, H.; Mochalov, O.; Moiseyev, V.; Nicklisch, N.; Pichler, S. L.; Risch, R.; Rojo Guerra, M. A.; et al. (2015a), "Massive migration from the steppe was a source for Indo-European languages in Europe. Supplementary Information", Nature, 522 (7555): 207–211, arXiv:1502.02783, Bibcode:2015Natur.522..207H, doi:10.1038/nature14317, PMC 5048219, PMID 25731166
- Hanks, B. (2009), "Late Prehistoric Mining, Metallurgy, and Social Organization in North Central Eurasia", in Hanks, B.; Linduff, K. (eds.), Social Complexity in Prehistoric Eurasia: Monuments, Metals, and Mobility, Cambridge University Press, pp. 146–167, doi:10.1017/CBO9780511605376.005, ISBN 978-0-511-60537-6
- Harmatta, János (1992), "The Emergence of the Indo-Iranians: The Indo-Iranian Languages" (PDF), in Dani, A. H.; Masson, V. M. (eds.), History of Civilizations of Central Asia: The Dawn of Civilization: Earliest Times to 700 B.C., UNESCO, pp. 346–370, ISBN 978-9-231-02719-2
- Heyd, Volker (2017), "Kossinna's smile", Antiquity, 91 (356): 348–359, doi:10.15184/aqy.2017.21, hdl:10138/255652, S2CID 164376362
- Hiltebeitel, Alf (2002), "Hinduism", in Joseph Kitagawa (ed.), The Religious Traditions of Asia: Religion, History, and Culture, Routledge, ISBN 978-1-136-87597-7
- Hock, Hans Heinrich; Joseph, Brian Daniel (1996), Language History, Language Change, and Language Relationship: An Introduction to Historical and Comparative Linguistics, Walter de Gruyter, ISBN 978-3-110-14784-1
- Hollar, Sherman (2011), Mesopotamia, Britannica Educational Publishing, ISBN 978-1-615-30575-9
- Husovská, Ludmilá (1998), Slovakia: walking through centuries of cities and towns, Príroda, ISBN 978-8-007-01041-3
- Ivanova, M. (2012), "Kaukasus und Orient: Die Entstehung des 'Maikop-Phänomens' im 4. Jahrtausend v. Chr" (PDF), Praehistorische Zeitschrift, 87 (1): 1–28, doi:10.1515/pz-2012-0001, S2CID 163960361
- Jamison, Stephanie W. (2006), "The Indo-Aryan Controversy: Evidence and Inference in Indian History" (PDF), Journal of Indo-European Studies (Book Review), vol. 34, pp. 255–261
- Jones, Eppie R. (2016), "Upper Palaeolithic genomes reveal deep roots of modern Eurasians", Nature Communications, 6 8912, Bibcode:2015NatCo...6.8912J, doi:10.1038/ncomms9912, PMC 4660371, PMID 26567969
- Kassian, Alexei S., Mikhail Zhivlov, George Starostin, Artem A. Trofimov, Petr A. Kocharov, Anna Kuritsyna and Mikhail N. Saenko (2021). "Rapid radiation of the inner Indo-European languages: an advanced approach to Indo-European lexicostatistics". Linguistics, Volume 59 Issue 4.
- Kidner, Frank; Bucur, Maria; Mathisen, Ralph; McKee, Sally; Weeks, Theodore (27 December 2007), Making Europe: People, Politics, and Culture, Cengage Learning, ISBN 978-0-618-00479-9
- Kochhar, Rajesh (2000), The Vedic People: Their History and Geography, Sangam Books
- Kohl, Philip L. (2007), The Making of Bronze Age Eurasia, Cambridge University Press, ISBN 978-1-139-46199-3
- Kortlandt, Frederik (2010), An outline of proto-indo-european (working paper) (PDF)
- Koryakova, L. (1998a), Sintashta-Arkaim Culture, The Center for the Study of the Eurasian Nomads (CSEN), archived from the original on 9 February 1999
- Koryakova, L. (1998b), An Overview of the Andronovo Culture: Late Bronze Age Indo-Iranians in Central Asia, The Center for the Study of the Eurasian Nomads (CSEN), archived from the original on 1 December 1998
- Kozintsev, Alexander (Fall–Winter 2019), "Proto-Indo-Europeans: The Prologue" (PDF), The Journal of Indo-European Studies, vol. 47, no. 3–4
- Krech, Volkhard; Steinicke, Marian (2011), Dynamics in the History of Religions between Asia and Europe: Encounters, Notions, and Comparative Perspectives, Brill, ISBN 978-9-004-22535-0
- Kristiansen, Kristian (2020), "The Archaeology of Proto-Indo-European and Proto-Anatolian: Locating the Split", in Serangeli; Olander (eds.), Dispersals and Diversification: Linguistic and Archaeological Perspectives on the Early-Stages of Indo-European, Brill, p. 157
- Iversen, Rune; Kroonen, Guus (2017), "Talking Neolithic: Linguistic and Archaeological Perspectives on how Indo-European was Implemented in Southern Scandinavia" (PDF), American Journal of Archaeology, 121 (4): 511–525, doi:10.3764/aja.121.4.0511, hdl:1887/72458, S2CID 4811514
- Kroonen, Guus; Barjamovic, Gojko; Peyrot, Michael (2018), Linguistic supplement to Damgaard et al. 2018: Early Indo-European languages, Anatolian, Tocharian and Indo-Iranian
- Kuzmina, Elena E. (2007), The Origin of the Indo-Iranians, Brill
- Kuznetsov, P. F. (2006), "The emergence of Bronze Age chariots in eastern Europe", Antiquity, 80 (309): 638–645, doi:10.1017/S0003598X00094096, S2CID 162580424
- Lazaridis, Iosif; Haak, Wolfgang; Patterson, Nick; Anthony, David; Reich, David (2015), "Massive migration from the steppe is a source for Indo-European languages in Europe. Supplementary Information 11. Relevance of ancient DNA to the problem of Indo-European language dispersals", Nature, 522 (7555): 207–211, arXiv:1502.02783, Bibcode:2015Natur.522..207H, doi:10.1038/nature14317, PMC 5048219, PMID 25731166
- Lazaridis, Iosif (2016), "Genomic insights into the origin of farming in the ancient Near East", Nature, 536 (7617): 419–424, Bibcode:2016Natur.536..419L, bioRxiv 10.1101/059311, doi:10.1038/nature19310, PMC 5003663, PMID 27459054
- Lazaridis, Iosif; Alpaslan-Roodenberg, Songül; et al. (2022), "The genetic history of the Southern Arc: A bridge between West Asia and Europe", Science, 377 (6609) eabm4247, Bibcode:2022Sci...377m4247L, doi:10.1126/science.abm4247, ISSN 0036-8075, PMC 10064553, PMID 36007055, S2CID 251843620
- Lazaridis, Josif; Patterson, Nick; Anthony, David (2025). "The genetic origin of the Indo-Europeans" (PDF). Nature. 639 (8053): 132–142. Bibcode:2025Natur.639..132L. doi:10.1038/s41586-024-08531-5. PMC 11922553. PMID 39910300.
- Linderholm, Anna (2020), "Corded Ware cultural complexity uncovered using genomic and isotopic analysis from south-eastern Poland", Scientific Reports, 10 (1) 6885, Bibcode:2020NatSR..10.6885L, doi:10.1038/s41598-020-63138-w, PMC 7165176, PMID 32303690
- Loewe, Michael; Shaughnessy, Edward L. (1999), The Cambridge History of Ancient China: From the Origins of Civilization to 221 BC, Cambridge University Press, ISBN 978-0-521-47030-8
- Mallory, J. P. (1989), In Search of the Indo-Europeans: Language, Archaeology, and Myth, London: Thames & Hudson, ISBN 978-0-500-27616-7
- Mallory, J. P. (1999), In Search of the Indo-Europeans: Language, Archaeology, and Myth (reprint ed.), London: Thames & Hudson, ISBN 978-0-500-27616-7
- Mallory, J. P.; Adams, D. Q. (1997), Encyclopedia of Indo-European Culture, Taylor & Francis, ISBN 978-1-884-96498-5
- Mallory, J. P. (2002), "Archaeological models and Asian Indo-Europeans", in Sims-Williams, Nicholas (ed.), Indi-Iranian languages and peoples, Oxford University Press
- Mallory, J. P.; Adams, D. Q. (2006), The Oxford introduction to Proto-Indo-European and the Proto-Indo-European world (Repr. ed.), Oxford University Press, ISBN 978-0-199-28791-8
- Mallory, J. P.; Mair, Victor H. (2008), The Tarim Mummies: Ancient China and the Mystery of the Earliest Peoples from the West, Thames & Hudson, ISBN 978-0-500-28372-1
- Mallory, J. P. (2013), "Twenty-first century clouds over Indo-European homelands" (PDF), Journal of Language Relationship, 9: 145–154, doi:10.31826/jlr-2013-090113, S2CID 212689004
- Mallory, J. P.; Dybo, A.; Balanovsky, O. (2020), "The Impact of Genetics Research on Archaeology and Linguistics in Eurasia", Russian Journal of Genetics, 55 (12): 1472–1487, doi:10.1134/S1022795419120081, S2CID 210914627
- Malmström, Helena (9 October 2019), "The genomic ancestry of the Scandinavian Battle Axe Culture people and their relation to the broader Corded Ware horizon", Proceedings of the Royal Society B, vol. 286, no. 1912, Royal Society, doi:10.1098/rspb.2019.1528, PMC 6790770, PMID 31594508
- Mathieson; et al. (2018), "The Genomic History of Southeastern Europe", Nature, 555 (7695): 197–203, Bibcode:2018Natur.555..197M, bioRxiv 10.1101/135616, doi:10.1038/nature25778, PMC 6091220, PMID 29466330
- Mountain, Harry (1998), The Celtic Encyclopedia, Universal, ISBN 978-1-581-12890-1
- Metspalu, Mait (9 December 2011), "Shared and Unique Components of Human Population Structure and Genome-Wide Signals of Positive Selection in South Asia", American Journal of Human Genetics, 89 (6): 731–44, doi:10.1016/j.ajhg.2011.11.010, PMC 3234374, PMID 22152676
- Nandris, John (1976), "The Dacian Iron Age – A Comment in a European Context", in Friesinger, Herwig; Kerchler, Helga; Pittioni, Richard; Mitscha-Märheim, Herbert (eds.), Archaeologia Austriaca, vol. 13 (Festschrift für Richard Pittioni zum siebzigsten Geburtstag ed.), Vienna: Deuticke, ISBN 978-3-700-54420-3, ISSN 0003-8008
- Narain, A. K. (1990), "Indo-Europeans in Central Asia", in Sinor, Denis (ed.), The Cambridge History of Early Inner Asia, vol. 1, Cambridge University Press, pp. 151–177, ISBN 978-1-139-05489-8
- Narasimhan, Vagheesh M.; Anthony, David; Mallory, James; Reich, David (2019), "The formation of human populations in South and Central Asia", Science, 365 (6457) eaat7487, Bibcode:2019Sci...365t7487N, bioRxiv 10.1101/292581, doi:10.1126/science.aat7487, PMC 6822619, PMID 31488661
- Nichols, Johanna (1997), "The Epicenter of the Indo-European Linguistic Spread", in Blench, Roger; Spriggs, Matthew (eds.), Archaeology and Language Vol. I: Theoretical and Methodological Orientations, London: Routledge
- Nichols, Johanna (1999), "The Eurasian Spread Zone and the Indo-European Dispersal", in Blench, Roger; Spriggs, Matthew (eds.), Archaeology and Language II: Correlating archaeological and Linguistic Hypotheses, Routledge
- Nordqvist, Kerkko; Heyd, Volker (2020), "The Forgotten Child of the Wider Corded Ware Family: Russian Fatyanovo Culture in Context", Proceedings of the Prehistoric Society, 86: 65–93, doi:10.1017/ppr.2020.9, hdl:10138/321831, S2CID 228923806
- Parpola, Asko (1998), "Aryan Languages, Archaeological Cultures, and Sinkiang: Where Did Proto-Iranian Come into Being and How Did It Spread?", in Mair (ed.), The Bronze Age and Early Iron Age Peoples of Eastern Central Asia, Washington, D.C.: Institute for the Study of Man, ISBN 978-0-941-69463-6
- Parpola, Asko (2015), The Roots of Hinduism. The Early Aryans and the Indus Civilization, Oxford University Press
- Parpola, Asko (2017), "Finnish vatsa – Sanskrit vatsá – and the formation of Indo-Iranian and Uralic languages", Journal de la Société Finno-Ougrienne, vol. 2017, no. 96, doi:10.33340/susa.70229, hdl:10138/311944
- Parpola, Asko (2020), "Royal "Chariot" Burials of Sanauli near Delhi and Archaeological Correlates of Prehistoric Indo-Iranian Languages", Studia Orientalia Electronica, 8: 176, doi:10.23993/store.98032
- Pereltsvaig, Asya; Lewis, Martin W. (2015), The Indo-European Controversy, Cambridge University Press
- Piggot, Stuart (1965), Ancient Europe from the Beginnings of Agriculture to Classical Antiquity: a Survey, Chicago: Aldine
- Plotkin, Vulf (2008), The Evolution of Germanic Phonological Systems: Proto-Germanic, Gothic, West Germanic, and Scandinavian, Lewiston: Edwin Mellen
- Polomé, Edgar C. (1992), Lippi-Green, Rosina (ed.), Recent Developments in Germanic Linguistics, John Benjamins, ISBN 978-9-027-23593-0
- Polomé, Edgar Charles; Fee, Christopher R.; Leeming, David Adams (2006), "Germanic mythology", in Leeming, David Adams (ed.), The Oxford Companion to World Mythology, Oxford University Press, ISBN 978-0-199-91648-1
- Pulleyblank, Edwin G. (1966), Chinese and Indo-Europeans, University of British Columbia, Department of Asian Studies
- Ravinutala, Abhijith (2013), Politicizing the Past: Depictions of Indo-Aryans in Indian Textbooks from 1998–2007
- Reich, David (2018), Who We Are and How We Got Here: Ancient DNA and the New Science of the Human Past, Knopf Doubleday
- Renfrew, Colin (1990) [1987], Archaeology and Language: The Puzzle of Indo-European Origins, Cambridge University Press, ISBN 978-0-521-38675-3
- Renfrew, Colin (2003), "Time Depth, Convergence Theory, and Innovation in Proto-Indo-European: 'Old Europe' as a PIE Linguistic Area", in Bammesberger, Alfred; Vennemann, Theo (eds.), Languages in Prehistoric Europe, Heidelberg: Universitätsverlag Winter, pp. 17–48, ISBN 978-3-825-31449-1
- Ringe, Don (2006), From Proto-Indo-European to Proto-Germanic, A Linguistic History of English, vol. 1 (1st ed.), New York City: Oxford University Press, ISBN 978-0-19-928413-9, OCLC 64554645, OL 7405151M, Wikidata Q131605459
- Roisman, Joseph; Worthington, Ian, eds. (2010), A Companion to Ancient Macedonia, John Wiley & Sons, ISBN 978-1-405-17936-2
- Salmons, Joseph (2015), "Language shift and the Indo-Europanization of Europe", in Mailhammer, Robert; Vennemann, Theo; Olsen, Birgit Anette (eds.), Origin and Development of European Languages, Museum Tusculanum Press
- Samuel, Geoffrey (2010), The Origins of Yoga and Tantra. Indic Religions to the Thirteenth Century, Cambridge University Press
- Serangeli, Matilede (2020), "Introduction: Dispersals and Diversification of the Indo-European Languages", in Serangeli, Matilde; Olander, Thomas (eds.), Dispersals and Diversification: Linguistic and Archaeological Perspectives on the Early Stages of Indo-European, Brill
- Sergent, Bernard (1995). Les Indo-Européens – Histoire, langues, mythes.
- Singh, Upinder (2008), A History of Ancient and Early Medieval India: From the Stone Age to the 12th Century, Pearson Education India, ISBN 978-8-131-71677-9
- Sjögren, Karl-Göran (2020), "Kinship and social organization in Copper Age Europe. A cross-disciplinary analysis of archaeology, DNA, isotopes, and anthropology from two Bell Beaker cemeteries", PLOS ONE, 15 (11) e0241278, Bibcode:2020PLoSO..1541278S, doi:10.1371/journal.pone.0241278, PMC 7668604, PMID 33196640
- Strabo (2014), The Geography of Strabo: An English Translation, with Introduction and Notes, translated by Duane W. Roller, Cambridge University Press, ISBN 978-1-139-95249-1
- Strazny, Philipp, ed. (2000), Dictionary of Historical and Comparative Linguistics (1 ed.), Routledge, ISBN 978-1-579-58218-0
- Svyatko, Svetlana V.; Mallory, James P.; Murphy, Eileen M.; Polyakov, Andrey V.; Reimer, Paula J.; Schulting, Rick J. (2009), "New Radiocarbon Dates and a Review of the Chronology of Prehistoric Populations from the Minusinsk Basin, Southern Siberia, Russia", Radiocarbon, 51 (1–2009), pp. 243–273, appendix I p. 266, Bibcode:2009Radcb..51..243S, doi:10.1017/S0033822200033798
- Thapar, Romila (2006), India: Historical Beginnings and the Concept of the Aryan, National Book Trust, ISBN 978-8-123-74779-8
- Thomas, Homer L. (1992), "Archaeology And Indo-European Comparative Linguistics", in Polomé, Edgar C. (ed.), Reconstructing Languages and Cultures, vol. 1, Walter de Gruyter, pp. 281–315, ISBN 978-3-110-12671-6
- Treptow, Kurt W. (1996), A History of Romania, Polygon, ISBN 978-0-880-33345-0
- Underhill, Peter A. (2010), "Separating the post-Glacial coancestry of European and Asian Y chromosomes within haplogroup R1a", Eur J Hum Genet, vol. 18, no. 4, pp. 479–484, doi:10.1038/ejhg.2009.194, PMC 2987245, PMID 19888303
- Underhill, Peter A. (2014), "The phylogenetic and geographic structure of Y-chromosome haplogroup R1a", European Journal of Human Genetics, 23 (1): 124–131, doi:10.1038/ejhg.2014.50, PMC 4266736, PMID 24667786
- Vybornov, Aleksandr (2016), "Initial stages of two Neolithisation models in the Lower Volga basin", Documenta Praehistorica, 43: 161–166, doi:10.4312/dp.43.7
- Wang CC, et al. (2018). "The genetic prehistory of the Greater Caucasus". Nature Communications. 10 (1): 590. Bibcode:2019NatCo..10..590W. bioRxiv 10.1101/322347. doi:10.1038/s41467-018-08220-8. PMC 6360191. PMID 30713341.
- Wang, Chuan-Chao; et al. (2019), "Ancient human genome-wide data from a 3000-year interval in the Caucasus corresponds with eco-geographic regions", Nature Communications, 10 (1) 590, Bibcode:2019NatCo..10..590W, bioRxiv 10.1101/322347, doi:10.1038/s41467-018-08220-8, PMC 6360191, PMID 30713341
- Wells, Spencer; Read, Mark (2002), The journey of man: a genetic odyssey, Princeton University Press, p. 168, ISBN 978-0-691-11532-0
- Wilkes, J. J. (1995), The Illyrians, Oxford: Blackwell, ISBN 978-0-631-19807-9
- Witzel, Michael (1989), "Tracing the Vedic dialects", Dialectes dans les Littératures Indo-Aryennes, pp. 97–265
- Witzel, Michael E. J. (2001), "Autochthonous Aryans? The Evidence from Old Indian and Iranian Texts" (PDF), Electronic Journal of Vedic Studies, vol. 7, no. 3, pp. 1–115
- Witzel, Michael (1995), "Early Sanskritization: Origin and Development of the Kuru state" (PDF), Electronic Journal of Vedic Studies, vol. 1, no. 4, pp. 1–26, archived from the original (PDF) on 11 June 2007
- Witzel, Michael (1998), "The Home of the Aryans", in A. Hinze; E. Tichy (eds.), Anusantatyi: Festschrift fuer Johanna Narten zum 70. Geburtstag (PDF), Münchener Studien zur Sprachwissenschaft, Dettelbach: J. H. Roell, pp. 1–53, (Beihefte NF 19)
- Witzel, Michael (December 2003), "Linguistic Evidence for Cultural Exchange in Prehistoric Western Central Asia" (PDF), Sino-Platonic Papers, vol. 129, pp. 1–70
- Young, Steven (2009), "Balto-Slavic languages", Concise Encyclopedia of Languages of the World, pp. 135–136, ISBN 978-0-080-87774-7
- Zvelebil, Marek (1997), "Pitted Ware And Related Cultures Of Neolithic Northern Europe", in Bogucki, Peter I.; Crabtree, Pam J. (eds.), Ancient Europe 8000 B.C.- A.D. 1000, Encyclopedia of the Barbarian World, vol. 1, Scribner, pp. 431–435, ISBN 0-684-80669-X

Websources
