= Proto-Indo-European homeland =

Geographic region where the proto-Indo-European language originated

The Proto-Indo-European homeland (present-day parts of Kazakhstan, Moldova, Romania, Russia and Ukraine) according to the steppe hypothesis (dark green) and the present distribution of Indo-European languages in Eurasia (light green).

The Proto-Indo-European homeland was the prehistoric homeland of the Proto-Indo-European language (PIE), the region where the proto-language was spoken before it split into the dialects from which the earliest Indo-European languages later evolved with the Indo-European migrations. The Steppe theory, the Anatolian model, and the Near Eastern (or Armenian) model are the three main solutions for the Indo-European homeland, (Note: Mallory (2013): "The speakers at this symposium can generally be seen to support one of the following three 'solutions' to the Indo-European homeland problem: 1. The Anatolian Neolithic model [...] 2. The Near Eastern model [...] 3. The Pontic-Caspian model.") of which the Steppe theory is the most widely accepted proposal. (Note: See: Bomhard (2019, p. 2): "This scenario is supported not only by linguistic evidence, but also by a growing body of archeological and genetic evidence. The Indo-Europeans have been identified with several cultural complexes existing in that area between 4500—3500 BCE. The literature supporting such a homeland is both extensive and persuasive [...]. Consequently, other scenarios regarding the possible Indo-European homeland, such as Anatolia, have now been mostly abandoned"; Reich (2018, p. 152): "This finding provides yet another line of evidence for the steppe hypothesis, showing that not just Indo-European languages, but also Indo-European culture as reflected in the religion preserved over thousands of years by Brahmin priests, was likely spread by peoples whose ancestors originated in the steppe."; Kristiansen et al. (2017, pp. 341–342): "When we add the evidence from ancient DNA, and the additional evidence from recent linguistic work discussed above, the Anatolian hypothesis must be considered largely falsified. Those Indo-European languages that later came to dominate in western Eurasia were those originating in the migrations from the Russian steppe during the third millennium BCE."; Anthony & Ringe (2015, p. 199): "Archaeological evidence and linguistic evidence converge in support of an origin of Indo-European languages on the Pontic-Caspian steppes around 4000 years BCE. The evidence is so strong that arguments in support of other hypotheses should be reexamined."; Mallory (1989, p. 185): "The Kurgan solution is attractive and has been accepted by many archaeologists and linguists, in part or total. It is the solution one encounters in the Encyclopedia Britannica and the Grand Dictionnaire Encyclopédique Larousse.")

The search for the homeland of the Indo-Europeans began during the late 18th century with the discovery of the Indo-European language family. The methods used to establish the homeland have been drawn from the disciplines of historical linguistics, archaeology, physical anthropology and, more recently, human population genetics. The Steppe theory puts the archaic, early, and late PIE homeland in the Pontic–Caspian steppe between 4000–3000 BCE. with Lazaridis and Anthony proposing that archaic PIE ('Indo-Anatolian') emerged in an area between the Caucasus and the lower Volga (a region centered on the southwestern steppe just north of the Caucasus) c. 4400–4000 BCE.

A second possibility is the Anatolian hypothesis, which puts it in Anatolia c. 8000 BCE, but is incompatible with the genetic and linguistic data and has been "largely abandoned". A third group of proposals suggest an archaic PIE-homeland south of the Caucasus. (Note: Mallory, Dybo & Balanovsky (2020): "[G]enetics has pushed the current homeland debate into several camps: those who seek the homeland either in the southern Caucasus or Iran (CHG) and those who locate it in the steppelands north of the Caucasus and Caspian Sea (EHG).") This includes the Armenian hypothesis, which situates the homeland for archaic PIE ('Indo-Hittite') south of the Caucasus mountains, This hypothesis has gained renewed attention during the 2010s and 2020s due to aDNA research, which has resulted in various proposals for an archaic 'Indo-Anatolian' or 'Indo-Hittite' homeland south of the Caucasus or even in Iran, (Note: Southern suggestions: Haak et al. (2015) state that their findings of gene flow of a population that shares traits with modern-day Armenians into the Yamnaya pastoralist culture, lends some plausibility to the Armenian hypothesis. Yet, Haak et al. (2015, p. 138, Supplementary Information) also state that "the question of what languages were spoken by the 'Eastern European hunter-gatherers' and the southern, Armenian-like, ancestral population remains open."; Haak et al. (2015, Supplementary Information) full quote: "The Armenian plateau hypothesis gains in plausibility by the fact that we have discovered evidence of admixture in the ancestry of Yamnaya steppe pastoralists, including gene flow from a population of Near Eastern ancestry for which Armenians today appear to be a reasonable surrogate (SI4, SI7, SI9). However, the question of what languages were spoken by the 'Eastern European hunter-gatherers' and the southern, Armenian-like, ancestral population remains open." Lazaridis et al. (2016) state that "farmers related to those from Iran spread northward into the Eurasian steppe," but do not repeat Haak's suggestion.; David Reich, in his 2018 publication Who We Are and How We Got Here, noting the presence of some Indo-European languages (such as Hittite) in parts of ancient Anatolia, states that "Ancient DNA available from this time in Anatolia shows no evidence of steppe ancestry similar to that in the Yamnaya [...] This suggests to me that the most likely location of the population that first spoke an Indo-European language was south of the Caucasus Mountains, perhaps in present-day Iran or Armenia, because ancient DNA from people who lived there matches what we would expect for a source population both for the Yamnaya and for ancient Anatolians." Yet, Reich also notes that "...the evidence here is circumstantial as no ancient DNA from the Hittites themselves has yet been published" (Reich 2018, p. 120).; Kristian Kristiansen, in an interview with Der Spiegel in May 2018, stated that the Yamnaya culture may have had a predecessor at the Caucasus, where "proto-proto-Indo-European" was spoken (Grolle 2018, p. 108) In a 2020 publication, Kristiansen writes that "...the origin of Anatolian should be located in the Caucasus, at a time when it acted as a civilizational corridor between south and north. Here the Maykop Culture of the northern Caucasus stands out as the most probable source for Proto-Anatolian, and perhaps even Proto-Indo-Anatolian" (Kristiansen 2020) Yet, the idea of Maykop origins is incompatible with the genetic ancestry of the Maykop culture, which was too rich in Anatolian farmer ancestry to be ancestral to Proto-Indo-Europeans.; In his book A Short History of Humanity published in 2019, German geneticist Johannes Krause from the Max Planck Institute, states that "we are quite certain that the Indo-European languages ultimately originated in the Fertile Crescent, as proponents of the Anatolian theory suppose, but not, as they suggest, in western and central Anatolia; rather, it emerged from northern Iran. Similarly, advocates of the steppe thesis are probably right to suggest that Indo-European came to Europe and maybe Central and Southern Asia from the steppes. But that doesn't mean it originated there." Elsewhere in the same book he suggests "the region around Armenia, Azerbaijan, eastern Turkey, and northwest Iran" as a possible place or origin (Krause & Trappe 2021, p. 122, 186).) with Lazaridis and Anthony eventually proposing PIE emerged in an area between the Caucasus and the lower Volga.

Several other explanations have been proposed, including eastern Caspian origins, the outdated but historically prominent North European hypothesis, the Neolithic creolisation hypothesis, the Paleolithic continuity paradigm, the Arctic theory, and the "indigenous Aryans" (or "out of India") hypothesis. These are not widely accepted, and are considered to be fringe theories.

== Theoretical considerations and constraints for homeland-proposals ==
Traditionally, homelands of linguistic families are proposed based on evidence from comparative linguistics coupled with evidence of historical populations and migrations from archaeology. Presently, genetics via DNA samples is increasingly used for the study of ancient population movements.

=== Reconstructed vocabulary ===
Using comparative linguistics it is possible to reconstruct the vocabulary found in the proto-language, and in this way achieve some knowledge of the cultural, technological and ecological context that the speakers inhabited. Such a context can then be compared with archaeological evidence. This vocabulary includes, in the case of (late) PIE, which is based on the post-Anatolian and post-Tocharian IE-languages:

- pastoralism, including domesticated cattle, horses, and dogs
- agriculture and cereal cultivation, including technology commonly ascribed to late-Neolithic farming communities, e.g., plows.
- a climate with winter snow
- transportation by or across water
- the solid wheel used for wagons, but not yet chariots with spoked wheels.

Zsolt Simon notes that, although it can be useful to determine the period when the Proto-Indo-European language was spoken, using the reconstructed vocabulary to locate the homeland may be flawed, since we do not know whether Proto-Indo-European speakers knew a specific concept because it was part of their environment or because they had heard of it from other peoples they were interacting with.

=== Uralic, Caucasian and Semitic borrowings ===
Proto-Finno-Ugric and PIE have a lexicon in common, generally related to trade, such as words for "price" and "draw, lead". Similarly, "sell" and "wash" were borrowed in Proto-Ugric. Although some have proposed a common ancestor (the hypothetical Indo-Uralic language family), this is generally regarded as the result of intensive borrowing, which suggests that their homelands were located near each other. Proto-Indo-European also exhibits lexical loans to or from Caucasian languages, particularly Proto-Northwest Caucasian and Proto-Kartvelian, which suggests a location close to the Caucasus mountains.

Gamkrelidze and Ivanov, using the now largely unsupported glottalic theory of Indo-European phonology, also proposed Semitic borrowings into Proto-Indo-European, suggesting a more southern homeland to explain these borrowings. According to Mallory and Adams, some of these borrowings may be too speculative or from a later date, but they consider the proposed Semitic loans *táwros 'bull' and *wéyh₁on- 'wine; vine' to be more likely.

Anthony notes that the small number of Semitic loanwords in Proto-Indo-European that are generally accepted by linguists, such as words for bull and silver, could have been borrowed via trade and migration routes rather than through direct contact with the Semitic linguistic homeland.

=== Genesis of Indo-European languages ===
==== Phases of Proto-Indo-European ====
According to Anthony, the following terminology may be used:

- Archaic PIE for "the last common ancestor of the Anatolian and non-Anatolian IE branches";
- Early, or Post-Anatolian, PIE for "the last common ancestor of the non-Anatolian PIE languages, including Tocharian";
- Late PIE for "the common ancestor of all other IE branches".

The Anatolian languages are the first Indo-European language family to have been separated from the main group. Due to the archaic elements preserved in the Anatolian languages, they may be a "cousin" of Proto-Indo-European, instead of a "child", but Anatolian is generally regarded as an early offshoot of the Indo-European language group.

The Indo-Hittite hypothesis postulates a common predecessor for both the Anatolian languages and the other Indo-European languages, termed Indo-Hittite or Indo-Anatolian. Although PIE had predecessors, according to Melchert (2012) the Indo-Hittite hypothesis is not widely accepted, and there is little to suggest that it is possible to reconstruct a proto-Indo-Hittite stage that differs substantially from what is already reconstructed for PIE.

Anthony (2019) suggests a derivation of the proto-Indo-European language mainly from a base of languages spoken by Eastern European Hunter-Gatherers living in the Volga steppes, with influences from languages spoken by northern Caucasus hunter-gatherers who migrated from the Caucasus to the lower Volga basin, in addition to a possible later and lesser influence from the language of the Maikop culture to the south (which is hypothesized to have belonged to the North Caucasian family) during the later Neolithic or Bronze Age involving little genetic effect. Lazaridis and Anthony (2025) have reinvigorated Indo-Anatolian with their proposal of an archaic PIE homeland between the Caucasus and the lower Volga with Indo-Anatolian emerging between 4400 and 4000 BCE.

=== Phylogenetic analyses of languages ===
Lexico-statistical studies intended to show the relationship between the various branches of Indo-European languages began during the late 20th century with work by Dyen et al. (1992) and Ringe et al. (2002). Subsequently, a number of authors performed a Bayesian phylogenetic analysis of the IE languages (a mathematical method used for evolutionary biology to establish relationships between species). A secondary intent of these studies was to attempt to estimate the approximate dates at which the various branches separated from each other.

The earlier studies tended to estimate a relatively long time-frame for the development of the different branches. In particular the study by Bouckaert and colleagues (which included a geographical element) was "decisively" in favour of Anatolia as the geographical origin, and assisted Colin Renfrew's hypothesis that Indo-European spread from Anatolia along with agriculture from 7500 to 6000 BCE onwards. According to their analysis, the five major Indo-European subfamilies – Celtic, Germanic, Italic, Balto-Slavic and Indo-Iranian – all emerged as distinct lineages between 4000 and 2000 BCE. The authors stated that this time-scale is consistent with secondary movements such as the expansion of the steppe peoples after 3000 BCE, which they suggest also played a role in the spread of Indo-European languages.

Using models of Bayesian phylogenetic inference, Heggarty et al. (2023) suggest that Indo-European languages emerged 8000 years before present (6000 BCE).

== Steppe theory ==
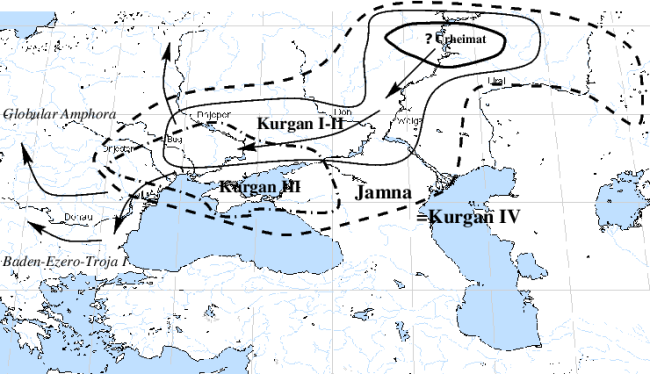
Overview of Gimbutas's Kurgan hypothesis

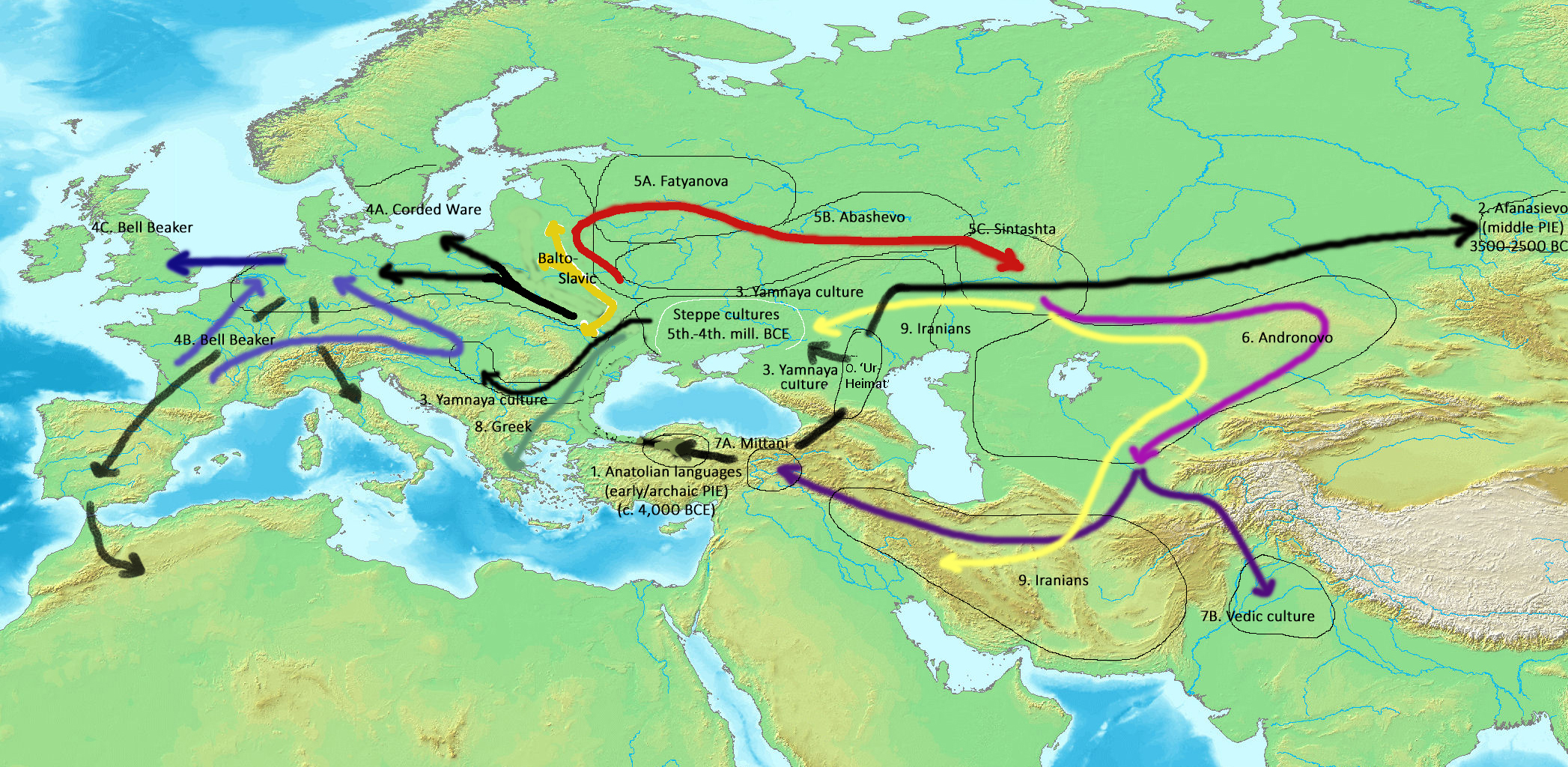
Scheme of Indo-European language dispersals from c. 4000 to 1000 BCE according to the widely held Kurgan hypothesis: Center: Steppe cultures; 0 'Ur-Heimat'; 1 (black): Anatolian languages (archaic PIE); 2 (black): Afanasievo culture (early PIE); 3 (black): Yamnaya culture expansion (Pontic-Caspian steppe, Danube Valley; late PIE); 4A (black): Western Corded Ware; 4B-C (blue and dark blue): Bell Beaker; adopted by Indo-European speakers; 5A-B (red): Eastern Corded ware; 5C (red): Sintashta (proto-Indo-Iranian); 6 (magenta): Andronovo; 7A (purple): Indo-Aryans (Mittani); 7B (purple): Indo-Aryans (India); [NN] (dark yellow): proto-Balto-Slavic; 8 (grey): Greek; 9 (yellow): Iranians; Not drawn are Armenian, expanding from Catacomb culture into the South Caucasus.

The steppe hypothesis seeks to identify the source of the Indo-European language expansion which resulted in a succession of migrations from the Pontic–Caspian steppe between the 5th and 3rd millennia BCE. During the early 1980s, a mainstream consensus had emerged among Indo-Europeanists in favour of the "Kurgan hypothesis" (named after the kurgans, burial mounds, of the Eurasian steppes) placing the Indo-European homeland in the Pontic–Caspian steppe of the Chalcolithic.

According to linguist Allan R. Bomhard (2019), the steppe hypothesis proposed by archeologists Marija Gimbutas and David W. Anthony "is supported not only by linguistic evidence, but also by a growing body of archeological and genetic evidence. The Indo-Europeans have been identified with several cultural complexes existing in that area between 4500 and 3500 BCE. The literature supporting such a homeland is both extensive and persuasive [...]. Consequently, other scenarios regarding the possible Indo-European homeland, such as Anatolia, have now been mostly abandoned," although critical issues such as the way the proto-Greek, proto-Armenian, proto-Albanian, proto-Celtic, and proto-Anatolian languages became spoken in their attested homeland are still debated within the context of the steppe model.

=== Gimbutas's Kurgan hypothesis ===
According to the Kurgan hypothesis as formulated by Gimbutas, Indo-European speaking nomads from Eastern Ukraine and Southern Russia expanded on horseback in several waves during the 3rd millennium BCE, invading and subjugating supposedly peaceful European Neolithic farmers of Gimbutas's Old Europe. (Note: Librado et al. (2021), "The origins and spread of domestic horses from the Western Eurasian steppes", Nature, doubt if the first Yamnaya-migrants used horseriding: "Our results reject the commonly held association between horseback riding and the massive expansion of Yamnaya steppe pastoralists into Europe around 3000 bc, driving the spread of Indo-European languages, rejecting "scenarios in which horses were the primary driving force behind the initial spread of Indo-European languages in Europe." According to Librado et al. (2021), "This contrasts with the scenario in Asia where Indo-Iranian languages, chariots and horses spread together, following the early second millennium bc Sintashta culture.") Later versions of Gimbutas's hypothesis increasingly emphasized the patriarchal and patrilineal nature of the invading culture, in contrast with the supposedly egalitarian and matrilineal culture of the invaded.

=== Archaeology ===
The archaeologist J. P. Mallory, dating the migrations to c. 4000 BCE, and having less insistence on their violent or quasi-military nature, essentially modified Gimbutas's theory making it compatible with a less gender-political narrative. David Anthony, emphasizing mostly the evidence for the domestication of horses and the presence of wheeled vehicles, came to regard specifically the Yamnaya culture, which replaced the Sredny Stog culture about 3500 BCE, as the most likely candidate for the Proto-Indo-European speech community.

Anthony describes the spread of cattle-raising from early farmers in the Danube Valley into the Ukrainian steppes in the 6th–5th millennium BCE, forming a cultural border with the hunter-gatherers whose languages may have included archaic PIE. Anthony notes that domesticated cattle and sheep probably didn't enter the steppes from the Transcaucasia, since the early farming communities there were not widespread, and separated from the steppes by the glaciated Caucasus. Subsequent cultures developed in this area which adopted cattle, most notably the Cucuteni-Trypillian culture.

The Indologist Asko Parpola regards the Cucuteni-Trypillian culture as the birthplace of wheeled vehicles, and therefore as the homeland for Late PIE, assuming that Early PIE was spoken by Skelya pastoralists (early Sredny Stog culture) who took over the Tripillia culture at c. 4300–4000 BCE. On its eastern border lay the Sredny Stog culture (4400–3400 BCE), whose origins are related to "people from the east, perhaps from the Volga steppes". It plays the main role in Gimbutas's Kurgan hypothesis, and coincides with the spread of early PIE across the steppes and into the Danube valley (c. 4000 BCE), resulting in the end of Old Europe. Hereafter the Maykop culture suddenly began, Tripillia towns grew strongly, and eastern steppe people migrated to the Altai mountains, founding the Afanasevo culture (3300 to 2500 BCE).

=== Vocabulary ===
The core element of the steppe hypothesis is the identification of the proto-Indo-European culture as a nomadic pastoralist society that did not practice intensive agriculture. This identification rests on the fact that vocabulary related to cows, to horses and horsemanship, and to wheeled vehicles can be reconstructed for all branches of the family, whereas only a few agricultural vocabulary items are reconstructable, suggesting a gradual adoption of agriculture through contact with non-Indo-Europeans. If this evidence and reasoning is accepted, the search for the Indo-European proto-culture has to involve searching for the earliest introduction of domesticated horses and wagons into Europe.

Responding to these arguments, proponents of the Anatolian hypothesis Russell Gray and Quentin Atkinson have argued that the different branches could have independently developed similar vocabulary based on the same roots, creating the false appearance of shared inheritance – or alternatively, that the words related to wheeled vehicle might have been borrowed across Europe at a later date. Proponents of the Steppe hypothesis have argued this to be unlikely, and to violate the established principles for reasonable assumptions when explaining linguistic comparative data.

Another source of evidence for the steppe hypothesis is the presence of what appears to be many shared loanwords between Uralic languages and proto-Indo-European, suggesting that these languages were spoken in adjacent areas. This would have had to occur much further north than the Anatolian or Near Eastern scenarios would allow. According to Kortlandt, Indo-Uralic is the common ancestor of the Indo-European and Uralic language families. Kortlandt argues that "Indo-European is a branch of Indo-Uralic which was radically transformed under the influence of a North Caucasian substratum when its speakers moved from the area north of the Caspian Sea to the area north of the Black Sea." (Note: Kortlandt (2010) refers to Kortlandt, Frederik. 2007b. C.C. Uhlenbeck on Indo-European, Uralic and Caucasian.) (Note: Soviet and post-Soviet Russian archaeologists have proposed an East Caspian influence, via the eastern Caspian areas, on the formation of the Don-Volga cultures. See also Ancient DNA Era (11 January 2019), How did CHG get into Steppe_EMBA ? Part 2 : The Pottery Neolithic Yet, Mallory notes that "[t]he Kelteminar culture has on occasion been connected with the development of early stockbreeding societies in the Pontic-Caspian region, the area which sees the emergence of the Kurgan tradition, which has been closely tied to the early Indo-Europeans [...] Links between the two regions are now regarded as far less compelling and the Kelteminar culture is more often viewed more as a backwater of the emerging farming communities in Central Asia than the agricultural hearth of Neolithic societies in the steppe region. The "Sogdiana hypothesis" of Johanna Nichols places the homeland in the 4th or 5th millennium BCE to the east of the Caspian Sea, in the area of ancient Bactria-Sogdiana. From there, PIE spread north to the steppes, and south-west towards Anatolia. Nichols eventually rejected her theory, finding it incompatible with the linguistic and archaeological data. Since Nichols's initial proposal, Kozintsev has argued for an Indo-Uralic homeland east of the Caspian Sea. From this homeland, Indo-Uralic PIE-speakers migrated south-west, and divided in the southern Caucasus, forming the Anatolian and steppe languages at their respective locations. Bernard Sergent has elaborated on the idea of east Caspian influences on the formation of the Volga culture, arguing for a PIE homeland in the east Caspian territory, from where it migrated north. Sergent notes that the lithic assemblage of the first Kurgan culture in Ukraine (Sredni Stog II), which originated from the Volga and South Urals, recalls that of the Mesolithic-Neolithic sites to the east of the Caspian Sea, Dam Dam Chesme II and the cave of Djebel. Yet, Sergent places the earliest roots of Gimbutas's Kurgan cradle of Indo-Europeans in an even more southern cradle, and adds that the Djebel material is related to a Paleolithic material of Northwestern Iran, the Zarzian culture, dated 10,000–8500 BCE, and in the more ancient Kebarian of the Near East. He concludes that more than 10,000 years ago the Indo-Europeans were a small people grammatically, phonetically and lexically close to Semitic-Hamitic populations of the Near East. See also "New Indology", (2014), Can we finally identify the real cradle of Indo-Europeans?.) Anthony notes that the validity of such deep relationships cannot be reliably demonstrated due to the time-depth involved, and also notes that the similarities may be explained by borrowings from PIE into proto-Uralic. Yet, Anthony also notes that the North Caucasian communities "were southern participants in the steppe world".

Kloekhorst argues that the Anatolian languages have preserved archaisms which are also found in proto-Uralic, providing strong evidence for a steppe-origin of PIE.

=== Human genetics ===
The subclade R1a1a (R-M17 or R-M198) is the R1a subclade associated most commonly with Indo-European speakers. In 2000, Ornella Semino et al. proposed a postglacial (Holocene) period spread of the R1a1a haplogroup from north of the Black Sea during the time of the Late Glacial Maximum, which was subsequently magnified by the expansion of the Kurgan culture into Europe and eastward.

In 2015, a large-scale ancient DNA study by Haak et al. published in Nature found evidence of a "massive migration" from the Pontic-Caspian steppe to central Europe that occurred about 4,500 years ago. It found that individuals from the central European Corded Ware culture (3rd millennium BCE) were closely related genetically to individuals from the Yamnaya culture. The authors concluded that their "results provide support for the theory of a steppe origin of at least some of the Indo-European languages of Europe".

Two other genetic studies in 2015 gave support to the steppe hypothesis regarding the Indo-European Urheimat. According to those studies, specific subclades of Y chromosome haplogroups R1b and R1a, which are found in Yamnaya and other proposed early Indo-European cultures such as Sredny Stog and Khvalynsk, and are now the most common in Europe (R1a is also common in South Asia) would have expanded from the Ukrainian and Russian steppes, along with the Indo-European languages; these studies also detected an autosomal component present in modern Europeans that was not present in Neolithic Europeans, which would have been introduced with paternal lineages R1b and R1a, as well as Indo-European languages.

However, the folk-migration model cannot be the only diffusion theory for all linguistic families, as the Yamnaya ancestry component is particularly concentrated in Europe in the northwestern parts of the continent. Other models for languages like Proto-Greek are still debated. The steppe genetic component is more diffuse in studied Mycenaean populations: if they came from elsewhere, Proto-Greek speakers were certainly a minority in a sea of populations that had been familiar with agriculture for 4,000 years. Some propose that they gained progressive prominence through a cultural expansion by elite influence. But if high correlations can be proven in ethnolinguistic or remote communities, genetics does not always equate with language, and archaeologists have argued that although such a migration might have occurred it does not necessarily explain either the distribution of archaeological cultures or the spread of the Indo-European languages.

Russian archaeologist Leo Klejn (2017) noted that in the Yamnaya population, R1b-L23 is predominant, whereas Corded Ware males belong mostly to R1a, as well as far-removed R1b clades not found in Yamnaya. In his opinion, this does not support a Yamnaya origin for the Corded Ware culture. British archaeologist Barry Cunliffe describes this inconsistency as "disconcerting for the model as a whole". Klejn has also suggested that the autosomal evidence does not support a proposed Yamnaya migration, as Western Steppe Herder ancestry is lesser in the area from which the Yamnaya were proposed to have expanded, in both contemporary populations and Bronze Age specimens.

Furthermore, Balanovsy et al. (2017) found that the majority of the Yamnaya genomes studied by Haak and Mathieson belonged to the "eastern" R-GG400 subclade of R1b-L23, which is not common in western Europe, and none belonged to the "western" R1b-L51 branch. The authors conclude that the Yamnaya could not have been an important source of modern western European male haplogroups.

An analysis by David Anthony (2019) suggested a genetic origin of Proto-Indo-Europeans (associated with the Yamnaya culture) in the Eastern European steppe north of the Caucasus, deriving from a mixture of Eastern European hunter-gatherers (EHG) and hunter-gatherers from the Caucasus (CHG). Anthony also suggested that the Proto-Indo-European language formed mainly from a base of languages spoken by Eastern European hunter-gathers with influences from languages of northern Caucasus hunter-gatherers, in addition to a possible later and more minor influence from the language of the Maykop culture to the south (which is hypothesized to have belonged to the North Caucasian languages) during the later Neolithic or Bronze Age, involving little genetic effect.

In 2020, David Anthony offered a new hypothesis, with the intent of resolving the questions concerning the apparent absence of haplogroup R1a in Yamnaya. He speculates that haplogroup R1a must have been present in the Yamnaya, but that it was initially extremely rare, and that the Corded Ware culture are the descendants of this wayward population that migrated north from the Pontic steppe and greatly expanded in size and influence, later returning to dominate the Pontic-Caspian steppe.

== Anatolian hypothesis ==
Map showing the Neolithic expansion from the 7th to 5th millennia BCE.

=== Theory ===
The main competitor of the Kurgan hypothesis is the Anatolian hypothesis advanced by Colin Renfrew in 1987. It couples the spread of the Indo-European languages to the demonstrated fact of the Neolithic spread of farming from the Near East, stating that the Indo-European languages began to spread peacefully into Europe from Asia Minor from around 7000 BCE with the Neolithic advance of farming (wave of advance). The expansion of agriculture from the Middle East would have diffused three language families: Indo-European toward Europe, Dravidian toward Pakistan and India, and Afro-Asiatic toward Arabia and North Africa.

The Anatolian hypothesis proposed by archeologist Colin Renfrew places the pre-PIE homeland in Anatolia about 8000 BCE, and the homeland of Proto-Indo-European proper in the Balkans around 5000 BCE, with waves of linguistic expansion following the progression of agriculture in Europe. Although it has attracted substantive attention and discussions, the datings it proposes are at odds with the linguistic timeframe for Proto-Indo-European, and with genetic data which do not find evidence for Anatolian origins in the Indian gene pool.

According to Renfrew, the spread of Indo-European proceeded in the following phases:

- About 6500 BC: Pre-Proto-Indo-European, located in Anatolia, divides into Anatolian and Archaic Proto-Indo-European, the language of those Pre-Proto-Indo-European farmers who migrate to Europe in the initial farming dispersal. Archaic Proto-Indo-European languages occur in the Balkans (Starčevo-Körös-Cris culture), in the Danube valley (Linear Pottery culture), and possibly in the Bug-Dniestr area (Eastern Linear pottery culture).
- About 5000 BC: Archaic Proto-Indo-European divides into Northwestern Indo-European (the ancestor of Italic, Celtic, and Germanic), located in the Danube valley, Balkan Proto-Indo-European (corresponding to Gimbutas' Old European culture), and Early Steppe Proto-Indo-European (the ancestor of Tocharian).

Reacting to criticism, Renfrew revised his proposal to the effect of taking a pronounced Indo-Hittite position. Renfrew's revised opinion places only Pre-Proto-Indo-European in 7th millennium BCE Anatolia, proposing as the homeland of Proto-Indo-European proper the Balkans about 5000 BCE, explicitly identified as the "Old European culture" proposed by Marija Gimbutas. He thus still situates the original source of the Indo-European language family in Anatolia c. 7000 BCE. Reconstructions of a Bronze Age PIE society based on vocabulary items like "wheel" do not necessarily hold for the Anatolian branch, which appears to have separated from PIE at an early stage, prior to the invention of wheeled vehicles.

After the publication of several studies on ancient DNA in 2015, Colin Renfrew has accepted the reality of migrations of populations speaking one or several Indo-European languages from the Pontic steppe towards Northwestern Europe.

=== Objections ===
==== Dating and linguistics ====
The main objection to this theory is that it requires an unrealistically early date. According to linguistic analysis, the Proto-Indo-European lexicon seems to include words for a range of inventions and practices related to the Secondary Products Revolution, which post-dates the early spread of farming. On lexico-cultural dating, Proto-Indo-European cannot be earlier than 4000 BCE. Furthermore, it has been objected, on impressionistic grounds, that it seems unlikely that close equivalences such as Hittite [eːsmi, eːsi, eːst͜si] = Sanskrit [ásmi, ási, ásti] ("I am, you are, he is") could have survived over such a long timescale as the Anatolian hypothesis requires.

Apart from DNA evidence, Anthony and Ringe (2015) give a number of linguistic arguments against the Anatolian hypothesis. First, cognate words for "axle", "wheel", "wagon-pole", and "convey by vehicle" can be found in a number of Indo-European languages ranging from Irish to Tocharian, but not Anatolian. This suggests that Proto-European speakers, after the split with Anatolian, had wheeled vehicles, which the neolithic farmers did not. For various reasons, such as the regular sound-changes which the words exhibit, the suggestion that the words might have spread later by borrowing or have been introduced by parallel innovation in the different branches of Indo-European can be ruled out. Secondly, the words borrowed at an early date by Proto-Uralic, as well as those borrowed from Caucasian languages, indicate a homeland geographically between the Caucasus and the Urals. Thirdly, if the Indo-European languages had spread westwards from Anatolia, it might be expected that Greek would be closest to Anatolian, whereas in fact it is much closer to Indo-Aryan. In addition, the culture described in early poems such as Homer's – praise of warriors, feasting, reciprocal guest-friendship, and so on – more closely match what is known of the burial practices of the steppe peoples than the neolithic farmers.

==== Genetic research and migrations ====
The most recent DNA findings from ancient bones as well as modern people show that farmers whose ancestors originated in Anatolia did indeed spread across Europe from 6500 BCE onwards, eventually mixing with the existing hunter-gatherer population. However, about 2500 BCE, a massive influx of pastoralists from the steppe north of the Black Sea, associated with Corded Ware culture, spread from the east. Northern Europeans (especially Norwegians, Lithuanians, and Estonians) get nearly half their ancestry from this group; Spanish and Italians about a quarter, and Sardinians almost none. It is thought that this influx of pastoralists brought the Indo-European languages with them. Steppe ancestry is also found in the DNA of speakers of Indo-European languages in India, especially in the Y chromosome, which is inherited in the male line.

In general, the prestige associated with a specific language or dialect and its progressive dominance over others can be explained by the access to a natural resource unknown or unexploited until then by its speakers, which is thought to be horse-based pastoralism for Indo-European speakers rather than crop cultivation. (Note: The domestication of the horse is thought to have allowed for the moving of herds over longer distances in periods of harsh climate (and made their surveillance easier), but also for a faster retreat in case of raiding on agricultural communities.)

==== Archaeology and the spread of farming ====
The idea that farming was spread from Anatolia in a single wave has been revised. Instead, it appears to have spread in several waves by several routes, primarily from the Levant. The trail of plant domesticates indicates an initial foray from the Levant by sea. The overland route via Anatolia seems to have been most significant in spreading farming into south-east Europe.

According to Lazaridis et al. (2016), farming developed independently both in the Levant and in the eastern Fertile Crescent. After this initial development, the two regions and the Caucasus interacted, and the chalcolithic north-west Iranian population appears to be a mixture of Iranian Neolithic, Levant, and Caucasus hunter-gatherers. According to Lazaridis et al. (2016), "farmers related to those from Iran spread northward into the Eurasian steppe; and people related to both the early farmers of Iran and to the pastoralists of the Eurasian steppe spread eastward into South Asia". They further note that ANI (Ancestral North Indian) "can be modelled as a mix of ancestry related to both early farmers of western Iran and to people of the Bronze Age Eurasian steppe", which makes it unlikely that the Indo-European languages in India are derived from Anatolia.

=== Alignment with the steppe theory ===
According to Alberto Piazza "[i]t is clear that, genetically speaking, peoples of the Kurgan steppe descended at least in part from people of the Middle Eastern Neolithic who immigrated there from Anatolia." According to Piazza and Cavalli-Sforza (2006), the Yamnaya culture may have been derived from Middle Eastern Neolithic farmers who migrated to the Pontic steppe and developed pastoral nomadism:

... if the expansions began at 9,500 years ago from Anatolia and at 6,000 years ago from the Yamnaya culture region, then a 3,500-year period elapsed during their migration to the Volga-Don region from Anatolia, probably through the Balkans. There a completely new, mostly pastoral culture developed under the stimulus of an environment unfavorable to standard agriculture, but offering new attractive possibilities. Our hypothesis is, therefore, that Indo-European languages derived from a secondary expansion from the Yamnaya culture region after the Neolithic farmers, possibly coming from Anatolia and settled there, developing pastoral nomadism.

Wells (2002) agrees with Cavalli-Sforza that there is "some genetic evidence for migration from the Middle East":

... while we see substantial genetic and archaeological evidence for an Indo-European migration originating in the southern Russian steppes, there is little evidence for a similarly massive Indo-European migration from the Middle East to Europe. One possibility is that, as a much earlier migration (8,000 years old, as opposed to 4,000), the genetic signals carried by Indo-European-speaking farmers may simply have dispersed over the years. There is clearly some genetic evidence for migration from the Middle East, as Cavalli-Sforza and his colleagues showed, but the signal is not strong enough for us to trace the distribution of Neolithic languages throughout the entirety of Indo-European-speaking Europe.

Heggarty et al. (2023), postulating 6000 BCE as the date of emergence of the Indo-European languages, propose a hybrid model, in which Indo-European languages reached the steppe ca. 5000 BCE, and then spawned the Balto-Slavic and Germanic languages, while Indo-European languages reached India as early as 3000 BCE via a southern route (Iran) or ca. 1500 BCE via a northern route through the steppes. Kassian & Starostin (2025) criticised Heggarty's proposal, finding "serious issues" with the methodology, and noting that "the established datings contradict historical evidence in several major aspects".

== Armenian hypothesis and renewed southern proposals ==
A notable third possibility, which has gained renewed attention since the 2010s, is the "Near Eastern model", also known as the Armenian hypothesis. It was proposed by linguists Tamaz V. Gamkrelidze and Vyacheslav Ivanov in the early 1980s, postulating relationships between Indo-European and Caucasian languages based on the disputed glottalic theory and related to archaeological findings by Grogoriev.

Some recent DNA research has resulted in renewed suggestions of the possibility of a Caucasian or northwest Iranian homeland for archaic or 'proto-proto-Indo-European' (also termed 'Indo-Anatolian' or 'Indo-Hittite' in the literature), the common ancestor of both Anatolian languages and early proto-IE (from which Tocharian and all other early branches divided).

Yet, "[a]mong comparative linguists, a Balkan route for the introduction of Anatolian IE is generally considered more likely than a passage through the Caucasus, due, for example, to greater Anatolian IE presence and language diversity in the west."

=== Armenian hypothesis ===
Gamkrelidze and Ivanov proposed that the Urheimat was south of the Caucasus, specifically, "within eastern Anatolia, the southern Caucasus and northern Mesopotamia" during the 5th to 4th millennia BCE. Their proposal was based on a disputed theory of glottal consonants in PIE. According to Gamkrelidze and Ivanov, PIE words for material culture objects imply contact with more advanced peoples to the south, the existence of Semitic loan-words in PIE, Kartvelian borrowings from PIE, some contact with Sumerian, Elamite and others. However, given that the glottalic theory never became accepted very strongly and there was little archaeological evidence, the Gamkrelidze and Ivanov theory did not gain credence until Renfrew's Anatolian theory revived aspects of their proposal.

Gamkrelidze and Ivanov proposed that the Greeks moved west across Anatolia to their present location, a northward movement of some IE speakers that brought them into contact with the Finno-Ugric languages, and suggested that the Kurgan area, or better "Black Sea and Volga steppe", was a secondary homeland from which the western IE languages emerged.

=== South Caucasus/Iranian homeland suggestions ===
Recent DNA research which shows that the steppe-people derived from a mix of Eastern Hunter-Gatherers (EHG) and Caucasus Hunter-Gatherers, (Note: CHG, native to the Caucasus and Northern Iran, but also found in northern Pakistan, due to pre-farming CHG-migrations (Narasimhan et al. 2019, p. 11) and the Indo-Aryan migrations.(Narasimhan et al. 2019)) (Note: According to Margaryan et al. (2017) there was a rapid increase of the south Caucasian population at the end of the Last Glacial Maximum, about 18,000 years ago, while Fu et al. (2016) conclude that Near East and Caucasus people probably migrated to Europe already during the Mesolithic, around 14,000 years ago. Narasimhan et al. (2019) conclude that people "characteristic of northern Caucasus and Iranian plateau hunter-gatherers" reached India before 6000 BCE, (Note: Narasimhan et al.: "[One possibility is that] Iranian farmer–related ancestry in this group was characteristic of the Indus Valley hunter-gatherers in the same way as it was characteristic of northern Caucasus and Iranian plateau hunter-gatherers. The presence of such ancestry in hunter-gatherers from Belt and Hotu Caves in northeastern Iran increases the plausibility that this ancestry could have existed in hunter-gatherers farther east." Shinde et al. (2019) note that these Iranian people "had little if any genetic contribution from [...] western Iranian farmers or herders"; they split from each other more than 12,000 years ago. See also Razib Kkan, The Day of the Dasa: "...it may, in fact, be the case that ANI-like quasi-Iranians occupied northwest South Asia for a long time, and AHG populations hugged the southern and eastern fringes, during the height of the Pleistocene.") before the advent of farming in northern India.) has resulted in renewed suggestions of the possibility of a Caucasian, or even Iranian, homeland for an archaic proto-Indo-European, the common ancestor of both Anatolian languages and all other Indo-European languages. It is argued that this may support the Indo-Hittite hypothesis, according to which both proto-Anatolian and proto-Indo-European separated from a common language "no later than the 4th millennium BCE." Suggestions in this regard have been made by Haak et al. (2015, p. 138, Supplementary Information), Reich (2018, p. 120), Damgaard (2018, p. 7), Wang et al. (2019, p. 19), Grolle (2018, p. 108), Krause & Trappe (2021, pp. 122, 186), Lazaridis et al. (2022)

Damgaard et al. (2018) found that sampled Copper Age and Bronze Age Anatolians all had similar levels of CHG ancestry, but no EHG ancestry. They conclude that Early and Middle Bronze Age Anatolia did not receive ancestry from steppe populations, indicating that Indo-European language spread into Anatolia was not associated with large migrations from the steppe. The authors assert that their data is consistent with a scenario in which Indo-European languages were introduced to Anatolia in association with CHG admixture before c. 3700 BCE, in contrast to the standard steppe model, and despite the association of CHG ancestry with several non-Indo-European languages. Nevertheless, a second possibility, that Indo-European languages came to Anatolia along with small scale population movements and commerce, is described by them as also consistent with the data. They note that "Among comparative linguists, a Balkan route for the introduction of Anatolian IE is generally considered more likely than a passage through the Caucasus, due, for example, to greater Anatolian IE presence and language diversity in the west." (Note: Damgaard 2018, p. 7: "the early spread of IE languages into Anatolia was not associated with any large-scale steppe-related migration." Damgaard 2018, p. 8: "We cannot at this point reject a scenario in which the introduction of the Anatolian IE languages into Anatolia was coupled with the CHG-derived admixture before 3700 BCE [Caucasus CHG = Anatolia], but note that this is contrary to the standard view that PIE arose in the steppe north of the Caucasus and that CHG ancestry is also associated with several non-IE-speaking groups, historical and current. Indeed, our data are also consistent with the first speakers of Anatolian IE coming to the region by way of commercial contacts and smallscale movement during the Bronze Age. Among comparative linguists, a Balkan route for the introduction of Anatolian IE is generally considered more likely than a passage through the Caucasus, due, for example, to greater Anatolian IE presence and language diversity in the west.")

Wang et al. (2019) note that the Caucasus and the steppes were genetically separated in the 4th millennium BCE, but that the Caucasus served as a corridor for gene flow between cultures south of the Caucasus and the Maykop culture during the Copper and the Bronze Age, speculating that this "opens up the possibility of a homeland of PIE south of the Caucasus," which "could offer a parsimonious explanation for an early branching off of Anatolian languages, as shown on many PIE tree topologies." According to Wang et al. (2019), the typical steppe-ancestry, as an even mix between EHG and CHG, may result from "an existing natural genetic gradient running from EHG far to the north to CHG/Iran in the south," or it may be explained as "the result of Iranian/CHG-related ancestry reaching the steppe zone independently and prior to a stream of AF [Anatolian Farmer] ancestry." Wang et al. argue that evidence for gene flow to the steppe allows for a possible Indo-European homeland south of the Caucasus mountains. According to this model, Indo-European languages could have been brought north together with CHG ancestry, a scenario which could also explain the early separation from Anatolian. They note that "the spread of some or all of the PIE branches would have been possible via the North Pontic/Caucasus region and from there, along with pastoralist expansions, to the heart of Europe." However, Wang et al. also acknowledge that "the spread of some or all of the PIE branches would have been possible via the North Pontic/Caucasus region," as explained in the steppe hypothesis. (Note: Wang et al. (2019): "...latest ancient DNA results from South Asia suggest an LMBA spread via the steppe belt. Irrespective of the early branching pattern, the spread of some or all of the PIE branches would have been possible via the North Pontic/Caucasus region and from there, along with pastoralist expansions, to the heart of Europe. This scenario finds support from the well attested and widely documented 'steppe ancestry' in European populations and the postulate of increasingly patrilinear societies in the wake of these expansions.)

Lazaridis et al. (2022) state that the genetic evidence is consistent with an origin of Proto-Indo-European either in the EHGs of the steppe, or in the south (the southern arc), but argue that their evidence points to the latter. They argue that genetic evidence from the 'Southern Arc', an area which includes Anatolia, North Mesopotamia, Western Iran, Armenia, Azerbaijan, and the Caucasus, allows the possibility of a West Asian homeland for the Proto-Indo-European language. (Note: Lazaridis et al. refer to the common ancestor of all Indo-European languages (including the Anatolian branch) as "Proto-Indo-Anatolian", a terminology used by some linguists who propose a binary split between the Anatolian languages and the remaining Indo-European languages, restricting the term "Proto-Indo-European" to the common ancestor of the latter. For consistency and following mainstream linguistic practice, "Proto-Indo-European" is used here throughout for the common ancestor of all Indo-European languages including Anatolian.) In this opinion, Proto-Indo-European emerged in the southern arc, and was brought to Anatolia when Caucasus/Levantine-related ancestry flowed into Anatolia after the Neolithic, separating the Proto-Anatolian language from the rest of the Indo-European languages. They propose that subsequent migrations from the southern arc brought Proto-Indo-European to the steppes. (Note: Additionally, the study detects two distinct migrations from the Southern Arc into the Pontic-Caspian steppe; firstly, after c. 5000 BCE, Caucasus-related ancestry flows north and mixes with the Eastern hunter-gatherer population, resulting in the formation of the Eneolithic steppe populations of Khvalynsk and Progress. Before c. 3000 BCE, these Eneolithic Steppe populations have no discernible Anatolian/Levantine–related ancestry, unlike all contemporaneous Neolithic populations of the Southern Arc. Subsequently, in a second wave of migration, Anatolian/Levantine ancestry is transmitted to steppe populations, resulting in the formation of the Bronze Age Yamnaya population.) According to Lazaridis et al., the spread of all other (non-Anatolian) ancient Indo-European languages is associated with the migrations of Yamnaya pastoralists or genetically related populations. The study argues that Anatolian languages cannot be linked to steppe migrations due to the absence of EHG ancestry in ancient Anatolians, despite what the study describes as extensive sampling, including possible entry points into Anatolia by land or sea. The authors caution that they cannot yet identify the ultimate sources of population movements from the Southern Arc without further sampling of the possible source populations.

=== Bomhard's hybrid North Caspian/Caucasian hypothesis ===
Bomhard's Caucasian substrate hypothesis (2017, 2019) proposes an origin (Urheimat) in a Central Asian or North Caspian region of the steppe for Indo-Uralic (a proposed common ancestor of Indo-European and Uralic). Bomhard elaborates on Johanna Nichols "Sogdiana hypothesis", and Kortlandt's ideas of an Indo-Uralic proto-language, proposing an Urheimat north or east of the Caspian Sea, of a Eurasiatic language which was imposed on a population which spoke a Northwest Caucasian language, with this mixture producing proto-Indo-European. (Note: According to Allan R. Bomhard, "Proto-Indo-European is the result of the imposition of a Eurasiatic language – to use Greenberg's term – on a population speaking one or more primordial Northwest Caucasian languages." (Note: See also The Origins of Proto-Indo-European: The Caucasian Substrate Hypothesis.) Anthony states that the validity of such deep relationships cannot be reliably demonstrated due to the time-depth involved, and also notes that the similarities may be explained by borrowings from PIE into proto-Uralic. Yet, Anthony also notes that the North Caucasian communities "were southern participants in the steppe world".)

=== Caucasus-lower Volga steppe proposal for archaic PIE ===
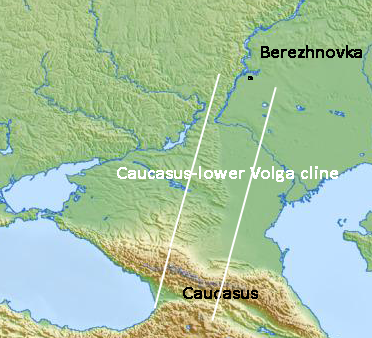
Cacasus-lower Volga cline, after Lazaridis et al. (2025), "Genetic origin of the indo-Europeans".

Other recent publications locate the origin of the ancestor of proto-Indo-European in the Eastern European/Eurasian steppe or from a hybridization of both steppe and Northwest-Caucasian languages.

Lazaridis and Anthony (2025) suggest a Caucasus-lower Volga cline between the Caucasus southern end and Berezhnovka at the lower Volga, speaking "proto-Indo-Anatolian", "the language ancestral to both Anatolian and Indo-European people, occur[ing] in CLV people some time between 4400 and 4000 BCE. This CLV-cline consists of "Aknashen-Maikop-Remontnoye-Berezhnovka." These four, arrayed in order of decreasing Caucasus Neolithic component, match their south-to-north location."

Lazaridis and Anthony et al. (2025) suggest a Caucasus-lower Volga cline (with a spectrum of both EHG ancestry from the steppe and CHG ancestry from the Caucasus) between the Caucasus and Berezhnovka at the lower Volga, speaking "proto-Indo-Anatolian", "the language ancestral to both Anatolian and Indo-European people, occur[ing] in CLV people some time between 4400 and 4000 BCE. They, for the first time, find traces of steppe ancestry in some samples in Anatolia from populations believed to have spoken languages of the Anatolian branch.

==== Anthony: Steppe homeland with south Caspian CHG-influences ====
Indo-European specialist and anthropologist David Anthony (2019) criticizes the Southern/Caucasian homeland hypothesis (including the suggestions of those such as Reich, Kristiansen, and Wang). Instead, Anthony argues that the roots of the proto-Indo-European language formed mainly from a base of languages spoken by Eastern European hunter-gatherers, with some influences from the languages of Caucasus hunter-gatherers. Anthony rejects the possibility that the Bronze Age Maykop people of the Caucasus were a southern source of language and genetics of Indo-European. Referring to Wang et al. (2019), he notes that the Anatolian Farmer component in the Yamnaya-ancestry came from European farmers, not from the Maykop, which had too much Anatolian farmer ancestry to be ancestral to the Yamnaya-population. Anthony also notes that the paternal lineages of the Yamnaya, which were rich in R1b, were related to those of earlier Eastern European hunter-gatherers, rather than those of southern or Caucasus peoples such as the Maykop. Anthony rejects the possibility that the Bronze Age Maykop people of the Caucasus were a southern source of language and genetics of Indo-European. According to Anthony, referring to Wang et al. (2019), (Note: See also Bruce Bower (8 February 2019), DNA reveals early mating between Asian herders and European farmers, ScienceNews.) the Maykop culture had little genetic effect on the Yamnaya, whose paternal lineages were found to differ from those found in Maykop remains, but were instead related to those of earlier Eastern European hunter-gatherers. Also, the Maykop (and other contemporary Caucasus samples), along with CHG from this date, had significant Anatolian Farmer ancestry "which had spread into the Caucasus from the west after about 5000 BC", while the Yamnaya had a lower percentage which does not fit with a Maykop origin. Partly for these reasons, Anthony concludes that Bronze Age Caucasus groups such as the Maykop "played only a minor role, if any, in the formation of Yamnaya ancestry." According to Anthony, the roots of Proto-Indo-European (archaic or proto-proto-Indo-European) were mainly in the steppe rather than the south. Anthony considers it likely that the Maykop spoke a Northern Caucasian language not ancestral to Indo-European.

Anthony proposes that the Yamnaya derived mainly from Eastern European hunter-gatherers (EHG) from the steppes, and undiluted Caucasus hunter-gatherers (CHG) from northwestern Iran or Azerbaijan, similar to the Hotu cave population, who mixed in the Eastern European steppe north of the Caucasus. According to Anthony, hunting-fishing camps from the lower Volga, dated 6200–4500 BCE, could be the remains of people who contributed the CHG-component, migrating westwards along the coast of the Caspian Sea, from an area south-east of the Caspian Sea. They mixed with EHG-people from the north Volga steppes, and the resulting culture contributed to the Sredny Stog culture, a predecessor of the Yamnaya culture.

Anthony (2024), addressing Lazaridis (2022), differentiates Early PIE (EPIE), prior to the Anatolian separation, from Late PIE (LPIE), also known as Core or Nuclear PIE, the ancestor of all other IE branches and evidencing the hypothesis that the LPIE dialects were spoken in the Pontic-Caspian steppes 3500-2500 BCE. He states that a homeland for early PIE in the Caucasus or the Pontic-Caspian steppe are both possibilities but that the second is the position supported. He also argues for the possibility of a steppe origin for the Anatolian branch, proposing that, "the Anatolian split could have been caused by a migration from the steppes into the Balkans associated with the Csongrad grave...and other Eneolithic steppe derived graves in the lower Danube valley", and that, in that area, steppe autosomal DNA could have been " lost a millennium later through local admixture before they moved to Anatolia", accounting for its absence in Anatolia (citing a similar case in Armenia).

== Outlier-theories ==
A number of other theories have been proposed, most of which have little or no academic credence presently:

- East-Caspian theory
- Modern nationalist doctrines:
  - Indigenous Aryanism, which suggests a homeland in the Indian subcontinent during the 6th millennium BCE, and is favored by Hindu nationalists.
  - Arctic theory, with a 8th millennium BCE or later origin in the Arctic region, which they left due to climate changes, migrating to northern Europe and South Asia. This theory was developed by Indian nationalist B. G. Tilak; and Lothar Kilian and, especially, Marek Zvelebil's models of a broader homeland, which is favored by Russian nationalists who identify the homeland with the Urals.
  - North European hypothesis, which suggests southern Scandinavia or the North German Plain as the original homeland and relates Proto-Indo-Europeans to a tall, very light-complexioned, blonde, blue-eyed race—supposed phenotypic traits of the Nordic race. This hypothesis is favored by some European and white ethnonationalists as well as neo-Nazis.
- Paleolithic continuity theory, supposes an origin during the Upper Paleolithic period.
- Nikolai Trubetzkoy's theory of a sprachbund origin of Indo-European traits.

=== Baltic homeland ===
Lothar Kilian and Marek Zvelebil have proposed a 6th millennium BCE or later origin of the IE-languages in Northern Europe, as a creolisation of migrating Neolithic farmers settling in northern Europe, and mixing with indigenous Mesolithic hunter-gatherer communities. The steppe theory is compatible with the argument that the PIE homeland must have been larger, because the "Neolithic creolisation hypothesis" allows the Pontic-Caspian region to have been part of PIE territory.

=== Paleolithic continuity theory ===
The Paleolithic continuity theory (also labeled "Paleolithic Continuity Paradigm" by Mario Alinei, its main proponent) is a hypothesis suggesting that the Proto-Indo-European language (PIE) can be traced back to the Upper Paleolithic, several millennia earlier than the Chalcolithic or at the most Neolithic estimates in other scenarios of Proto-Indo-European origins. Its claims are linguistically very improbable and depend on the assumption that there is no genetic and archaeological evidence for major population turnovers in Europe since the Last Glacial Maximum.

It was not listed by Mallory in 1997 among the proposals for the origins of the Indo-European languages that are widely discussed and considered credible by academia.

=== Hyperborea ===
Soviet Indologist Natalia R. Guseva and Soviet ethnographer S. V. Zharnikova, influenced by Bal Gangadhar Tilak's 1903 work The Arctic Home in the Vedas, argued for a northern Urals Arctic homeland of the Indo-Aryan and Slavic people; their ideas were popularized by Russian nationalists.

=== Out of India theory ===
The Indigenous Aryans theory, also known as the "out of India" theory, proposes an Indian origin for the Indo-European languages. The languages of northern India and Pakistan, including Hindi and the historically and culturally significant liturgical language Sanskrit, belong to the Indo-Aryan branch of the Indo-European language family. The Steppe model, rhetorically presented as an "Aryan invasion", has been opposed by Hindu revivalists and Hindu nationalists, who argue that the Aryans were indigenous to India, and some, such as B. B. Lal, Koenraad Elst and Shrikant Talageri, have proposed that Proto-Indo-European itself originated in northern India, either with or shortly before the Indus Valley civilisation. This "out of India" theory is not regarded as plausible by mainstream scholarship.

== See also ==
- Bronze Age Europe
- Indo-European studies
- Neolithic Europe
- Old European culture
- Proto-Indo-Europeans
- Indo-European migrations

== Sources ==
Printed sources

- Anthony, David W. (2007), The Horse, the Wheel and Language: How Bronze-Age Riders from the Eurasian Steppes Shaped the Modern World, Princeton University Press
- Anthony, David; Ringe, Don (2015), "The Indo-European Homeland from Linguistic and Archaeological Perspectives", Annual Review of Linguistics, 1 (1): 199–219, doi:10.1146/annurev-linguist-030514-124812
- Anthony, David W. (2019), "Archaeology, Genetics, and Language in the Steppes: A Comment on Bomhard", Journal of Indo-European Studies: 1–23
- Anthony, David (2020), "Ancient DNA, Mating Networks, and the Anatolian Split", in Serangeli, Matilde; Olander, Thomas (eds.), Dispersals and Diversification: Linguistic and Archaeological Perspectives on the Early Stages of Indo-European, BRILL, pp. 31–42, ISBN 978-90-04-41619-2
- Anthony, David (2020a). "Migration, Ancient DNA, and Bronze Age Pastoralists from the Eurasian Steppes". In Daniels, Megan (ed.). Homo Migrans: Modeling Mobility and Migration in Human History. IEMA Distinguished Monograph Series. Albany: SUNY Press.
- Bojtar, Endre (1999), Foreword to the Past: A Cultural History of the Baltic People, Central European University Press
- Bomhard, Allan (2019), "The Origins of Proto-Indo-European: The Caucasian Substrate Hypothesis", Journal of Indo-European Studies, 47 (1–2)
- Bouckaert, Remco; Lemey, Philippe; Dunn, Michael; Greenhill, Simon J.; Alekseyenko, Alexander V.; Drummond, Alexei J.; Gray, Russell D.; Suchard, Marc A.; Atkinson, Quentin D. (2012). "Mapping the Origins and Expansion of the Indo-European Language Family". Science. 337 (6097): 957–960. Bibcode:2012Sci...337..957B. doi:10.1126/science.1219669. PMC 4112997. PMID 22923579.
- Cavalli-Sforza, Luigi Luca (2000). Genes, peoples, and languages. Farrar Straus & Giroux. ISBN 978-0-86547-529-8.
- Chang, Will; Cathcart, Chundra; Hall, David; Garrett, Andrew (2015). "Ancestry-Constrained Phylogenetic Analysis Supports the Indo-European Steppe Hypothesis". Language, 91, Number 1, March 2015: 194–244.
- Damgaard, Peter de Barros (2018), "The First Horse herders and the Impact of Early Bronze Age Steppe expansions into Asia", Science, 360 (6396) eaar7711, Bibcode:2018Sci...360r7711D, doi:10.1126/science.aar7711, PMC 6748862, PMID 29743352
- Gray, Russell D.; Atkinson, Quentin D. (2003). "Language-tree divergence times support the Anatolian theory of Indo-European origin". Nature. 426 (6965): 435–439. Bibcode:2003Natur.426..435G. doi:10.1038/nature02029. PMID 14647380. S2CID 42340.
- Grolle, Johann (12 May 2018), "Invasion aus der Steppe", Der Spiegel
- Haak W, et al. (2015). "Massive migration from the steppe was a source for Indo-European languages in Europe". Nature. 522 (7555): 207–211. arXiv:1502.02783. Bibcode:2015Natur.522..207H. doi:10.1038/nature14317. PMC 5048219. PMID 25731166.
- Heggarty, Paul (2023). "Language trees with sampled ancestors support a hybrid model for the origin of Indo-European languages". Science. 381 (6656) eabg0818. doi:10.1126/science.abg0818. PMID 37499002.
- Kassian, Alexei S., Mikhail Zhivlov, George Starostin, Artem A. Trofimov, Petr A. Kocharov, Anna Kuritsyna and Mikhail N. Saenko (2021). "Rapid radiation of the inner Indo-European languages: an advanced approach to Indo-European lexicostatistics". Linguistics, Volume 59 Issue 4.
- Kassian, Alexei S.; Starostin, George (2025). "Do 'language trees with sampled ancestors' really support a 'hybrid model' for the origin of Indo-European? Thoughts on the most recent attempt at yet another IE phylogeny". Humanities and Social Sciences Communications. 12 682. doi:10.1057/s41599-025-04986-7.
- Kloekhorst, Alwin (2008), "Some Indo-Uralic Aspects of Hittite" (PDF), The Journal of Indo-European Studies, archived from the original (PDF) on 21 January 2021
- Kortlandt, Frederik (2010), An outline of proto-indo-european (working paper) (PDF)
- Kozintsev, Alexander (2019), "Proto-Indo-Europeans: The Prologue", Journal of Indo-European Studies, 47 (3–4)
- Krause, Johannes; Trappe, Thomas (2021) [2019]. A Short History of Humanity: A New History of Old Europe [Die Reise unserer Gene: Eine Geschichte über uns und unsere Vorfahren] (I ed.). New York: Random House. pp. 122, 186. ISBN 978-0-593-22942-2.
- Kristiansen, Kristian; Allentoft, Morten E.; Frei, Karin M.; Iversen, Rune; Johannsen, Niels N.; Kroonen, Guus; Pospieszny, Łukasz; Price, T. Douglas; Rasmussen, Simon; Sjögren, Karl-Göran; Sikora, Martin (2017). "Re-theorising mobility and the formation of culture and language among the Corded Ware Culture in Europe". Antiquity. 91 (356): 334–347. doi:10.15184/aqy.2017.17. hdl:1887/70150. ISSN 0003-598X.
- Kristiansen, Kristian (2020), "The Archaeology of Proto-Indo-European and Proto-Anatolian: Locating the Split", in Serangeli; Olander (eds.), Dispersals and Diversification: Linguistic and Archaeological Perspectives on the Early-Stages of Indo-European, BRILL, p. 157
- Kroonen, Guus; Barjamovic, Gojko; Peyrot, Michael (2018), Linguistic supplement to Damgaard et al. 2018: Early Indo-European languages, Anatolian, Tocharian and Indo-Iranian
- Lazaridis, I.; Reich, D. (2016). "Genomic insights into the origin of farming in the ancient Near East". Nature. 536 (7617): 419–424. Bibcode:2016Natur.536..419L. doi:10.1038/nature19310. ISSN 0028-0836. PMC 5003663. PMID 27459054.
- Lazaridis, Iosif; Mittnik, Alissa; Patterson, Nick; Mallick, Swapan; Rohland, Nadin; Pfrengle, Saskia; Furtwängler, Anja; Peltzer, Alexander; Posth, Cosimo; Vasilakis, Andonis; McGeorge, P.J.P. (2017). "Genetic origins of the Minoans and Mycenaeans". Nature. 548 (7666): 214–218. Bibcode:2017Natur.548..214L. doi:10.1038/nature23310. ISSN 0028-0836. PMC 5565772. PMID 28783727.
- Lazaridis, I. (2022). "The genetic history of the Southern Arc: A bridge between West Asia and Europe". Science. 377 (6609) eabm4247. Bibcode:2022Sci...377m4247L. doi:10.1126/science.abm4247. ISSN 0036-8075. PMC 10064553. PMID 36007055. S2CID 251843620.
- Lazaridis, Josif; Patterson, Nick; Anthony, David (2025). "The genetic origin of the Indo-Europeans" (PDF). Nature. 639 (8053): 132–142. Bibcode:2025Natur.639..132L. doi:10.1038/s41586-024-08531-5. PMC 11922553. PMID 39910300.
- Mallory, J. P. (1989), In Search of the Indo-Europeans: Language, Archaeology, and Myth, London: Thames & Hudson
- Mallory, J. P. (1996), Fagan, Brian M. (ed.), The Oxford Companion to Archaeology, Oxford University Press, ISBN 978-0-19-507618-9
- Mallory, James P. (1997), "The homelands of the Indo-Europeans", in Blench, Roger; Spriggs, Matthew (eds.), Archaeology and Language, vol. I: Theoretical and Methodological Orientations, London: Routledge, ISBN 978-0-415-11760-9.
- Mallory, J. P.; Adams, D. Q. (1997), Encyclopedia of Indo-European Culture, Taylor & Francis
- Mallory, J. P.; Adams, D. Q. (2006), The Oxford introduction to Proto-Indo-European and the Proto-Indo-European world (Repr. ed.), Oxford [u.a.]: Oxford Univ. Press, ISBN 978-0-19-928791-8
- Mallory, J .P. (2013), "Twenty-first century clouds over Indo-European homelands" (PDF), Journal of Language Relationship, 9: 145–154, doi:10.31826/jlr-2013-090113, S2CID 212689004
- Mallory, J. P.; Dybo, A.; Balanovsky, O. (2020), "The Impact of Genetics Research on Archaeology and Linguistics in Eurasia", Russian Journal of Genetics, 55 (12): 1472–1487, doi:10.1134/S1022795419120081, S2CID 210914627
- Narasimhan, Vagheesh M.; Anthony, David; Mallory, James; Reich, David; et al. (2019). "The formation of human populations in South and Central Asia". Science. 365 (6457) eaat7487. Bibcode:2019Sci...365t7487N. bioRxiv 10.1101/292581. doi:10.1126/science.aat7487. PMC 6822619. PMID 31488661.
- Nichols, Johanna (1997), "The Epicenter of the Indo-European Linguistic Spread", in Blench, Roger; Spriggs, Matthew (eds.), Archaeology and Language I: Theoretical and Methodological Orientations, Routledge
- Nichols, Johanna (1999), "The Eurasian Spread Zone and the Indo-European Dispersal", in Blench, Roger; Spriggs, Matthew (eds.), Archaeology and Language II: Correlating archaeological and Linguistic Hypotheses, Routledge
- Parpola, Asko (2015), The Roots of Hinduism. The Early Aryans and the Indus Civilisation, Oxford University Press
- Pereltsvaig, Asya; Lewis, Martin W. (2015), "Searching for Indo-European origins", The Indo-European Controversy: Facts and Fallacies in Historical Linguistics, Cambridge University Press, ISBN 978-1-107-05453-0
- Pereltsvaig, Asya; Lewis, Martin W. (2015a), "Bibliography", The Indo-European Controversy: Facts and Fallacies in Historical Linguistics, Cambridge University Press, pp. 288–315, doi:10.1017/CBO9781107294332.019, ISBN 978-1-107-05453-0
- Piazza, Alberto; Cavalli-Sforza, Luigi (2006). "Diffusion of genes and languages in human evolution". Proceedings of the 6th International Conference on the Evolution of Language. pp. 255–266. Archived from the original on 11 December 2008.
- Reich, David (2018). Who We Are and How We Got Here: Ancient DNA and the new science of the human past. Oxford University Press. ISBN 978-0-19-255438-3.
- Renfrew, Colin (1990). Archaeology and Language: The Puzzle of Indo-European Origins. CUP Archive. ISBN 978-0-521-38675-3.
- Shnirelman, Victor (2007), "Archaeology, Russian Nationalism, and the "Arctic Homeland"" (PDF), in Kohl, P. L.; Kozelsky, M.; Ben-Yehuda, N. (eds.), Selective Remembrances: Archaeology in the Construction, Commemoration, and Consecration of National Pasts, University of Chicago Press, archived (PDF) from the original on 23 April 2021
- Shinde, Vasant; Narasimhan, Vagheesh M.; Rohland, Nadin; Mallick, Swapan; et al. (2019), "An Ancient Harappan Genome Lacks Ancestry from Steppe Pastoralists or Iranian Farmers", Cell, 179 (3): 729–735.e10, doi:10.1016/j.cell.2019.08.048, PMC 6800651, PMID 31495572
- Trautmann, Thomas (2005). The Aryan Debate. Oxford University Press.
- Vybornov, Aleksandr (2016), "Initial stages of two Neolithisation models in the Lower Volga basin", Documenta Praehistorica, 43: 161–166, doi:10.4312/dp.43.7
- Wang CC, et al. (2018). "The genetic prehistory of the Greater Caucasus". Nature Communications. 10 (1): 590. Bibcode:2019NatCo..10..590W. bioRxiv 10.1101/322347. doi:10.1038/s41467-018-08220-8. PMC 6360191. PMID 30713341.
- Wang CC, et al. (2019), "Ancient human genome-wide data from a 3000-year interval in the Caucasus corresponds with eco-geographic regions", Nature Communications, 10 (1) 590, Bibcode:2019NatCo..10..590W, doi:10.1038/s41467-018-08220-8, PMC 6360191, PMID 30713341
- Wells, Spencer; Read, Mark (2002). The journey of man: a genetic odyssey. Princeton University Press. p. 168. ISBN 978-0-691-11532-0.
- Zvelebil (1995), "Indo-European origins and the agricultural transition in Europe", Whither Archaeology?: papers in honour of Evžen Neustupný
