= Proto-Indo-Europeans =

Postulated prehistoric ethnolinguistic group

The Proto-Indo-Europeans are a postulated prehistoric ethnolinguistic group of Eurasia who spoke Proto-Indo-European (PIE), the reconstructed common ancestor of the Indo-European language family. Knowledge of them comes chiefly from that linguistic reconstruction, along with material evidence from archaeology and archaeogenetics. The Proto-Indo-Europeans likely lived during the Late Neolithic to Chalcolithic (6400 to 3500 BC). Mainstream scholars place them in the Pontic–Caspian steppe across Eurasia (this steppe extends from northeastern Bulgaria and southeastern Romania, through Moldova, and southern and eastern Ukraine, through the Northern Caucasus of southern Russia, and into the Lower Volga region of western Kazakhstan, adjacent to the Kazakh steppe to the east, both forming part of the larger Eurasian Steppe). Some archaeologists would extend the time depth of PIE to the Middle Neolithic period (5500 to 4500 BC) or even the Early Neolithic period (7500 to 5500 BC) and suggest alternative origin hypotheses. By the early second millennium BC, descendants of the Proto-Indo-Europeans had reached far and wide across Eurasia, including Anatolia (Hittites), the Aegean (the linguistic ancestors of Mycenaean Greece), the north of Europe (Corded Ware culture), the edges of Central Asia (Yamnaya culture), and southern Siberia (Afanasievo culture).

== Definition ==
In the words of philologist Martin L. West, "If there was an Indo-European language, it follows that there was a people who spoke it: not a people in the sense of a nation, for they may never have formed a political unity, and not a people in any racial sense, for they may have been as genetically mixed as any modern population defined by language. If our language is a descendant of theirs, that does not make them 'our ancestors', any more than the ancient Romans are the ancestors of the French, the Romanians, and the Brazilians. The Indo-Europeans were a people in the sense of a linguistic community. We should probably think of them as a loose network of clans and tribes, inhabiting a coherent territory of limited size."

While "Proto-Indo-Europeans" is used in scholarship to designate the group of speakers associated with the reconstructed proto-language and culture, the term "Indo-Europeans" may refer to any historical people that speak an Indo-European language.

== Culture ==
Using linguistic reconstruction from old Indo-European languages such as Latin and Sanskrit, hypothetical features of the Proto-Indo-European language are deduced. Assuming that these linguistic features reflect the culture and environment of the Proto-Indo-Europeans, the following cultural and environmental traits are widely proposed:

- pastoralism, including domesticated cattle, horses, and dogs
- agriculture and cereal cultivation, including technology commonly ascribed to late-neolithic farming communities, e.g., the plow
- transportation by or across water
- the solid wheel, used for wagons, but not yet chariots with spoked wheels
- worship of a sky god, *Dyḗus Ph_{2}tḗr (lit. "sky father"; > Vedic Sanskrit Dyáuṣ Pitṛ́, Ancient Greek Ζεύς (πατήρ) / Zeus (patēr)), vocative *dyéw ph₂tér (> Latin Iūpiter, Illyrian Deipaturos) (Note: Watkins: "Yet, for the Indo-European-speaking society, we can reconstruct with certainty the word for "god," *deiw-os, and the two-word name of the chief deity of the pantheon, *dyeu-pəter- (Latin Iūpiter, Greek Zeus patēr, Sanskrit Dyauṣ pitar, and Luvian Tatis Tiwaz).")
- oral heroic poetry or song lyrics that used stock phrases such as imperishable fame (*ḱléwos n̥dʰgʷʰítom) and the wheel of the sun (*sh₂wéns kʷékʷlos).
- a patrilineal kinship-system based upon relationships between men (Note: Watkins: "A large number of kinship terms have been reconstructed. They are agreed in pointing to a society that was patriarchal, patrilocal (the bride leaving her household to join that of her husband's family), and patrilineal (descent reckoned by the male line). "Father" and "head of the household" are one: pǝter-, with his spouse, the māter-.")

A 2016 phylogenetic analysis of Indo-European folktales posits that one folktale, The Smith and the Devil, can be reconstructed to the Proto-Indo-European period. This story, found in contemporary Indo-European folktales from Scandinavia to India, describes a blacksmith who offers his soul to a malevolent being (commonly a devil in modern versions of the tale) in exchange for the ability to weld any kind of materials together. The blacksmith then uses his new ability to stick the devil to an immovable object (often a tree), thus avoiding his end of the bargain. According to the authors, the reconstruction of this folktale to PIE implies that the Proto-Indo-Europeans had metallurgy, which in turn "suggests a plausible context for the cultural evolution of a tale about a cunning smith who attains a superhuman level of mastery over his craft".

== History of research ==
Researchers have made many attempts to identify particular prehistoric cultures with the Proto-Indo-European-speaking peoples, but all of such theories remain speculative.

The scholars of the 1800s who first tackled the question of the Indo-Europeans' original homeland (also called Urheimat, from German), had essentially only linguistic evidence. They attempted a rough localization by reconstructing the names of plants and animals (importantly the beech and the salmon) as well as the culture and technology (a Bronze Age culture that was centered upon animal husbandry and having domesticated the horse). The scholarly opinions became basically divided between a European hypothesis, which posited a migration from Europe to Asia, and an Asian hypothesis, which posited that the migration took place in the opposite direction.

In the early 1900s, the question became associated with the expansion of a supposed "Aryan race", a now-discredited theory that was promoted during the expansion of European empires and the rise of "scientific racism". The question remains contentious within some flavours of ethnic nationalism (see also Indigenous Aryans).

There was a series of major advances in the 1970s due to the convergence of several factors. First, the radiocarbon dating method (invented in 1949) was now cheap enough to be applied on a mass scale. Through dendrochronology (tree-ring dating), pre-historians could calibrate radiocarbon dates with much more accuracy. And finally, before the 1970s, parts of eastern Europe and central Asia had been off-limits to Western scholars, while non-Western archaeologists did not have access to publication in Western peer-reviewed journals. The pioneering work of Marija Gimbutas, assisted by Colin Renfrew, at least partly addressed this problem by organizing expeditions and arranging for more academic collaboration between Western and non-Western scholars.

The Kurgan hypothesis, which is the most widely held theory as of 2017, depends upon linguistic and archaeological evidence, but is not universally accepted. It posits that the PIEs originated in the Pontic–Caspian steppe during the Chalcolithic age. A minority of scholars prefer the Anatolian hypothesis, which posits an origin in Anatolia during the Neolithic age. Other theories (Armenian hypothesis, Out of India theory, paleolithic continuity theory, and Balkan hypothesis) have only marginal scholarly support.

In regard to terminology, in the 19th and early 20th centuries, the term Aryan was used to refer to the Proto-Indo-Europeans and their descendants. However, Aryan more properly applies to the Indo-Iranians, the Indo-European branch that settled parts of the Middle East and South Asia, as only Indic and Iranian languages explicitly affirm the term as a self-designation referring to the entirety of their people, whereas the same Proto-Indo-European root (*aryo-) is the basis for Greek and Germanic word forms which seem only to denote the ruling elite of Proto-Indo-European (PIE) society. In fact, the most accessible evidence available confirms only the existence of a common, but vague, socio-cultural designation of "nobility" associated with PIE society, such that Greek socio-cultural lexicon and Germanic proper names derived from this root remain insufficient to determine whether the concept was limited to the designation of an exclusive, socio-political elite, or whether it could possibly have been applied in the most inclusive sense to an inherent and ancestral "noble" quality which allegedly characterized all ethnic members of PIE society. Only the latter could have served as a true and universal self-designation for the Proto-Indo-European people.

By the early 1900s, the term "aryan" had come to be widely used in a racial sense, in which it referred to a hypothesized white, blond, and blue-eyed superior race. The dictator Adolf Hitler called this race the "master race" (Herrenrasse), and, in its name, led massive pogroms in Europe. Subsequently, the term Aryan as a general term for Indo-Europeans has been largely abandoned by scholars (though the term Indo-Aryan is still used to refer to the branch that settled in Southern Asia).

== Urheimat hypotheses ==
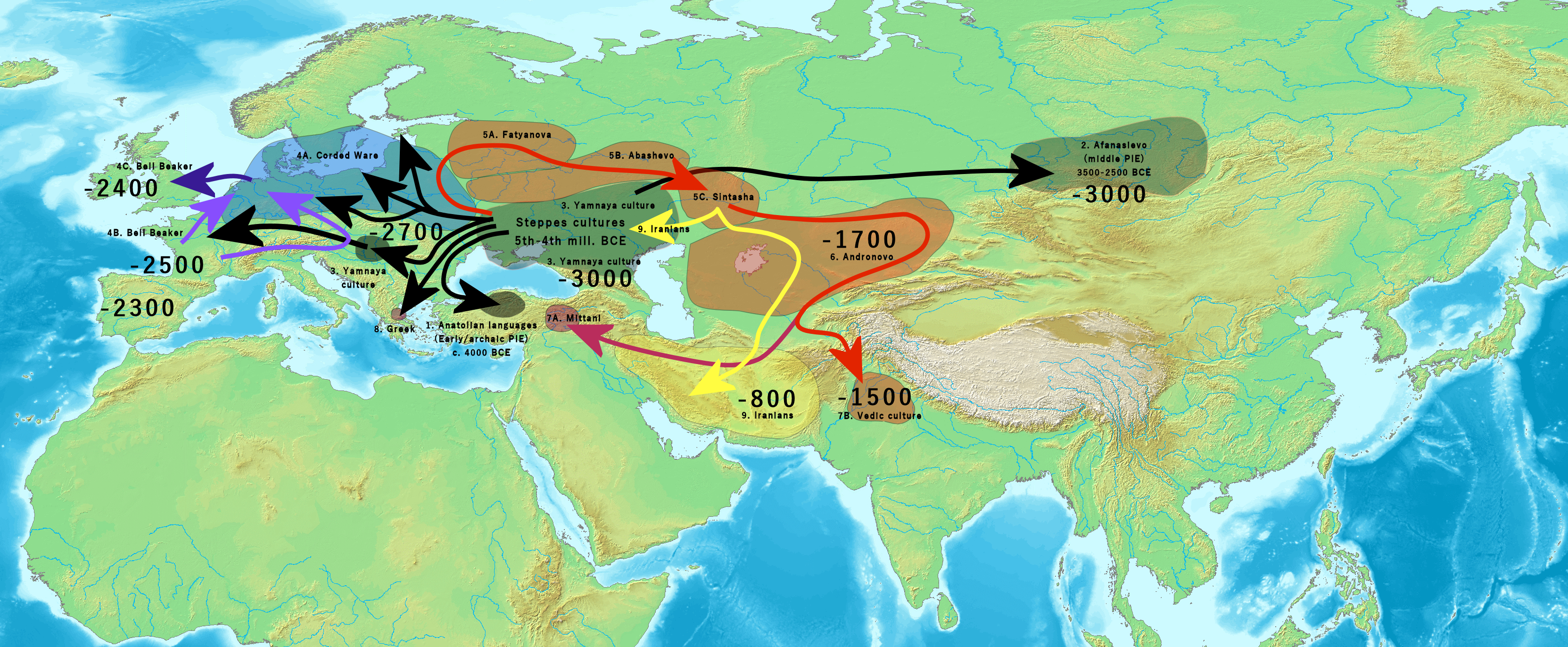
Scheme of Indo-European language dispersals from c. 4000 to 1000 BC according to the widely held Kurgan hypothesis. – Center: Steppe cultures 1 (black): Anatolian languages (archaic PIE) 2 (black): Afanasievo culture (early PIE) 3 (black) Yamnaya culture expansion (Pontic-Caspian steppe, Danube Valley) (late PIE) 4A (black): Western Corded Ware 4B-C (blue & dark blue): Bell Beaker; adopted by Indo-European speakers 5A-B (red): Eastern Corded ware 5C (red): Sintashta (proto-Indo-Iranian) 6 (magenta): Andronovo 7A (purple): Indo-Aryans (Mittani) 7B (purple): Indo-Aryans (India) [NN] (dark yellow): proto-Balto-Slavic 8 (grey): Greek 9 (yellow):Iranians – [not drawn]: Armenian, expanding from western steppe

According to some archaeologists, PIE speakers cannot be assumed to have been a single, identifiable people or tribe, but were a group of loosely related populations that were ancestral to the later, still partially prehistoric, Bronze Age Indo-Europeans. This is believed especially by those archaeologists who posit an original homeland of vast extent and immense time depth. However, this belief is not shared by most linguists, because proto-languages, like all languages before modern transport and communication, occupied small geographical areas over a limited time span, and were spoken by a set of close-knit communities– a tribe in the broad sense.

Researchers have put forward a great variety of proposed locations for the first speakers of Proto-Indo-European. Few of these hypotheses have survived scrutiny by academic specialists in Indo-European studies sufficiently well to be included in modern academic debate.

=== Pontic-Caspian steppe hypothesis ===
The Kurgan (or Steppe) hypothesis was first formulated by Otto Schrader (1883) and V. Gordon Childe (1926), and was later systematized by Marija Gimbutas from 1956 onwards. The name originates from the kurgans (burial mounds) of the Eurasian steppes. The hypothesis suggests that the Indo-Europeans, a patriarchal, patrilinear, and nomadic culture of the Pontic–Caspian steppe (which is now part northeastern Bulgaria and southeastern Romania, through Moldova, and southern and eastern Ukraine, through the northern Caucasus of southern Russia, and into the lower Volga region of western Kazakhstan), expanded into the area through several waves of migration during the 3rd millennium BCE, coinciding with the taming of the horse. Leaving archaeological signs of their presence (see Corded Ware culture), they subjugated the supposedly peaceful, egalitarian, and matrilinear European neolithic farmers of Gimbutas' Old Europe. A modified form of this theory, by J. P. Mallory, which dates the migrations to an earlier time (to around 3500 BCE), and puts less insistence upon their violent or quasi-military nature, remains the most widely accepted theory of the Proto-Indo-European expansion. (Note: See: Mallory: "The Kurgan solution is attractive and has been accepted by many archaeologists and linguists, in part or total. It is the solution one encounters in the Encyclopædia Britannica and the Grand Dictionnaire Encyclopédique Larousse."; Strazny: "The single most popular proposal is the Pontic steppes (see the Kurgan hypothesis)...")

=== Armenian highland hypothesis ===
The Armenian hypothesis, based on the glottalic theory, suggests that the Proto-Indo-European language was spoken during the 4th millennium BC in the Armenian Highland. This Indo-Hittite model does not include the Anatolian languages in its scenario. The phonological peculiarities of PIE proposed in the glottalic theory would be best preserved in the Armenian language and the Germanic languages, the former assuming the role of the dialect which remained in situ, implied to be particularly archaic in spite of its late attestation. Proto-Greek would be practically equivalent to Mycenean Greek and would date to the 17th century BC, closely associating Greek migration to Greece with the Indo-Aryan migration to India at about the same time (viz., Indo-European expansion at the transition to the Late Bronze Age, including the possibility of Indo-European Kassites). The Armenian hypothesis argues for the latest possible date of Proto-Indo-European (sans Anatolian), a full millennium later than the mainstream Kurgan hypothesis. In this, it figures as an opposite to the Anatolian hypothesis, in spite of the geographical proximity of the respective Urheimaten suggested, diverging from the time-frame suggested there by a full three millennia.

=== Anatolian hypothesis ===
The Anatolian hypothesis, notably advocated by Colin Renfrew from the 1980s onwards, proposes that the Indo-European languages spread peacefully into Europe from Anatolia from around 7000 BC with the Neolithic Revolution's advance of farming (wave of advance). The culture of the Indo-Europeans as inferred by linguistic reconstruction raises difficulties for this theory, since early neolithic cultures lacked the horse, the wheel, and metal – terms for all of which are securely reconstructed for Proto-Indo-European. Renfrew dismisses this argument, comparing such reconstructions to a theory that the presence of the word "café" in all modern Romance languages implies that the ancient Romans had cafés too.

Another argument, made by proponents of the steppe Urheimat (such as David Anthony) against Renfrew, points to the fact that ancient Anatolia is known to have been inhabited in the 2nd millennium BC by non-Indo-European-speaking peoples, namely the Hattians (perhaps North Caucasian-speaking), the Chalybes (language unknown), and the Hurrians (Hurro-Urartian).

Following the publication of several studies on ancient DNA in 2015, Colin Renfrew subsequently acknowledged the important role of migrations of populations speaking one or several Indo-European languages from the Pontic–Caspian steppe towards Northwestern Europe, noting that the DNA evidence from ancient skeletons "had completely rejuvenated Marija Gimbutas' kurgan hypothesis."

== Genetics ==
Archaeogenetics has allowed the use of genetic analysis to trace migration patterns.

=== Kurgan/Steppe hypothesis ===
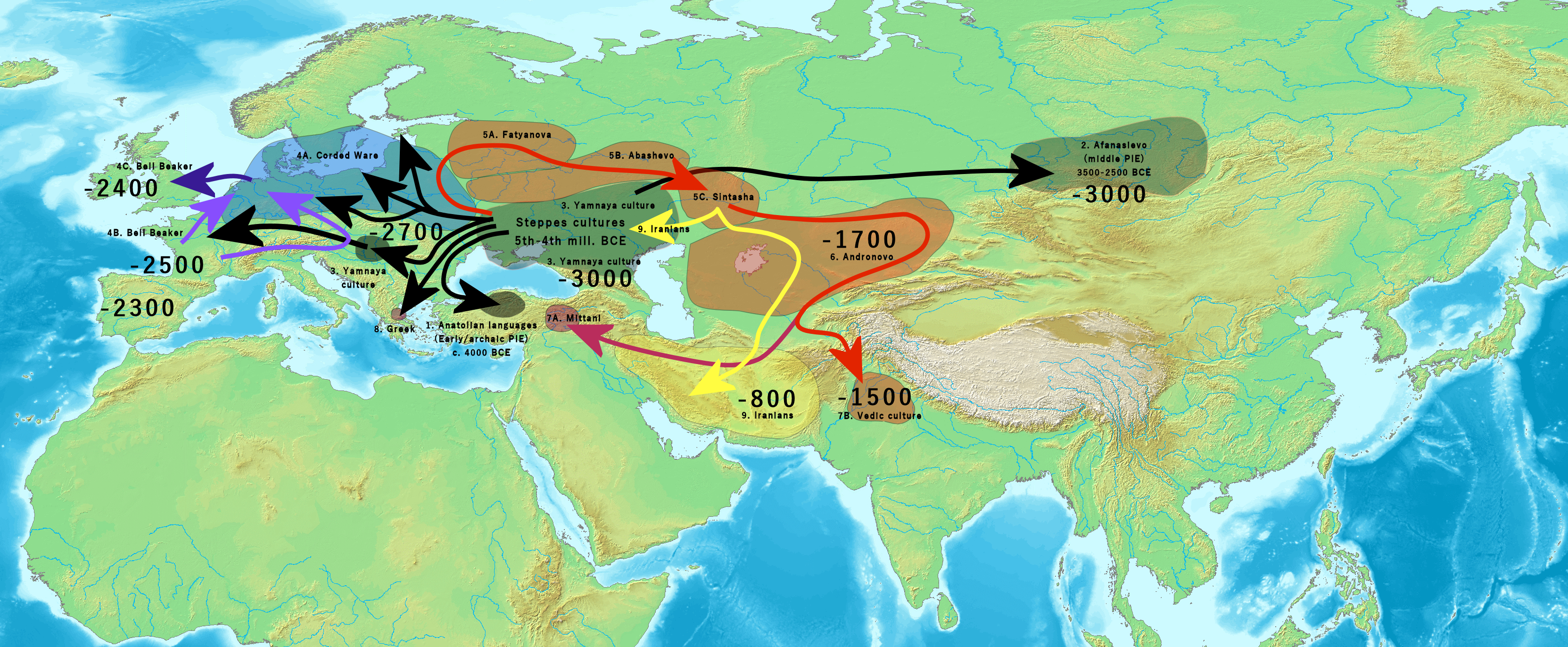
Early Indo-European migrations from the Pontic steppes and across Central Asia

The Kurgan hypothesis, or steppe theory, is the most widely accepted proposal to identify the Proto-Indo-European homeland from which the Indo-European languages spread out throughout Europe and parts of Asia. It postulates that the people of a Kurgan culture in the Pontic steppe north of the Black Sea were the most likely speakers of the Proto-Indo-European language (PIE). The term is derived from the Russian kurgan (курга́н), meaning 'tumulus' or 'burial mound'.

==== R1a and R1b ====
According to three autosomal DNA studies, haplogroups R1b and R1a, now the most common in Europe (R1a is also very common in South Asia) would have expanded from the Pontic steppes, along with the Indo-European languages; they also detected an autosomal component present in modern Europeans which was not present in Neolithic Europeans, which would have been introduced with paternal lineages R1b and R1a, as well as Indo-European languages. Studies which analysed ancient human remains in Ireland and Portugal suggest that R1b was introduced in these places along with autosomal DNA from the Pontic steppes.

==== R1a and R1a1a ====
The subclade R1a1a (R-M17 or R-M198) is most commonly associated with Indo-European speakers. Data so far collected indicate that there are two widely separated areas of high frequency:

- one in Eastern Europe, around Poland, Ukraine, and Russia,
- the other in Southern Asia, around the Indo-Gangetic Plain, which extends to parts of India, Pakistan, Bangladesh, and Nepal.

The historical and prehistoric possible reasons for this are the subject of on-going discussion and attention amongst population geneticists and genetic genealogists, and are considered to be of potential interest to linguists and archaeologists also.

A large study in 2014 by Underhill et al., using 16,244 individuals from over 126 populations from across Eurasia, concluded there was compelling evidence that R1a-M420 originated in the vicinity of Iran. The mutations that characterize haplogroup R1a occurred around 10,000 years BP. Its defining mutation (M17) occurred about 10,000 to 14,000 years ago. Pamjav et al. (2012) believe that R1a originated and initially diversified either within the Eurasian Steppes or in the Middle East and Caucasus region.

Ornella Semino et al. propose a postglacial (Holocene) spread of the R1a1 haplogroup from north of the Black Sea during the time of the Late Glacial Maximum, which was subsequently magnified by the expansion of the Kurgan culture into Europe and eastward.

==== Yamnaya culture ====
According to Jones et al. (2015) and Haak et al. (2015), autosomal tests indicate that the Yamnaya-people were the result of admixture between "Eastern Hunter-Gatherers" from eastern Europe (EHG) and "Caucasus hunter-gatherers" (CHG). Each of those two populations contributed about half the Yamnaya DNA. According to co-author Dr. Andrea Manica of the University of Cambridge:

The question of where the Yamnaya come from has been something of a mystery up to now [...] we can now answer that, as we've found that their genetic make-up is a mix of Eastern European hunter-gatherers and a population from this pocket of Caucasus hunter-gatherers who weathered much of the last Ice Age in apparent isolation.

All Yamnaya individuals sampled by Haak et al. (2015) belonged to the Y-haplogroup R1b.

Based on these findings and by equating the people of the Yamnaya culture with the Proto-Indo-Europeans, David W. Anthony (2019) suggests that the Proto-Indo-European language formed mainly from a base of languages spoken by Eastern European hunter-gathers with influences from languages of northern Caucasus hunter-gatherers, in addition to a possible later influence from the language of the Maikop culture to the south (which is hypothesized to have belonged to the North Caucasian family) in the later neolithic or Bronze Age involving little genetic impact.

===== Eastern European hunter-gatherers =====
According to Haak et al. (2015), "Eastern European hunter-gatherers" who inhabited Russia were a distinctive population of hunter-gatherers with high affinity to a ~24,000-year-old Siberian from the Mal'ta-Buret' culture, or other, closely related Ancient North Eurasian (ANE) people from Siberia and to the Western Hunter-Gatherers (WHG). Remains of the "Eastern European hunter-gatherers" have been found in Mesolithic or early Neolithic sites in Karelia and Samara Oblast, Russia, and put under analysis. Three such hunter-gathering individuals of the male sex have had their DNA results published. Each was found to belong to a different Y-DNA haplogroup: R1a, R1b, and J. R1b is also the most common Y-DNA haplogroup found among both the Yamnaya and modern-day Western Europeans. R1a is more common in Eastern Europeans and in the northern parts of the Indian subcontinent.

===== Near East population =====
The Near East population were most likely hunter-gatherers from the Caucasus (CHG) c.q. Iran Chalcolithic related people with a major CHG-component.

Jones et al. (2015) analyzed genomes from males from western Georgia, in the Caucasus, from the Late Upper Palaeolithic (13,300 years old) and the Mesolithic (9,700 years old). These two males carried Y-DNA haplogroups J* and J2a. The researchers found that these Caucasus hunters were probably the source of the farmer-like DNA in the Yamnaya, as the Caucasians were distantly related to the Middle Eastern people who introduced farming in Europe. Their genomes showed that a continued mixture of the Caucasians with Middle Eastern took place up to 25,000 years ago, when the coldest period in the last Ice Age started.

According to Lazaridis et al. (2016), "a population related to the people of the Iran Chalcolithic contributed ~43% of the ancestry of early Bronze Age populations of the steppe."; and these Iranian Chalcolithic people were a mixture of "the Neolithic people of western Iran, the Levant, and Caucasus Hunter Gatherers." (Note: See also: * eurogenes.blogspot, The genetic structure of the world's first farmers (Lazaridis et al. preprint) * anthrogenica.com, Lazaridis et al: The genetic structure of the world's first farmers (pre-print)) They also note that farming spread in two places in the Near East, namely the Levant and Iran, from where it spread, Iranian people spreading to the steppe and south Asia.

==== Northern and Central Europe ====
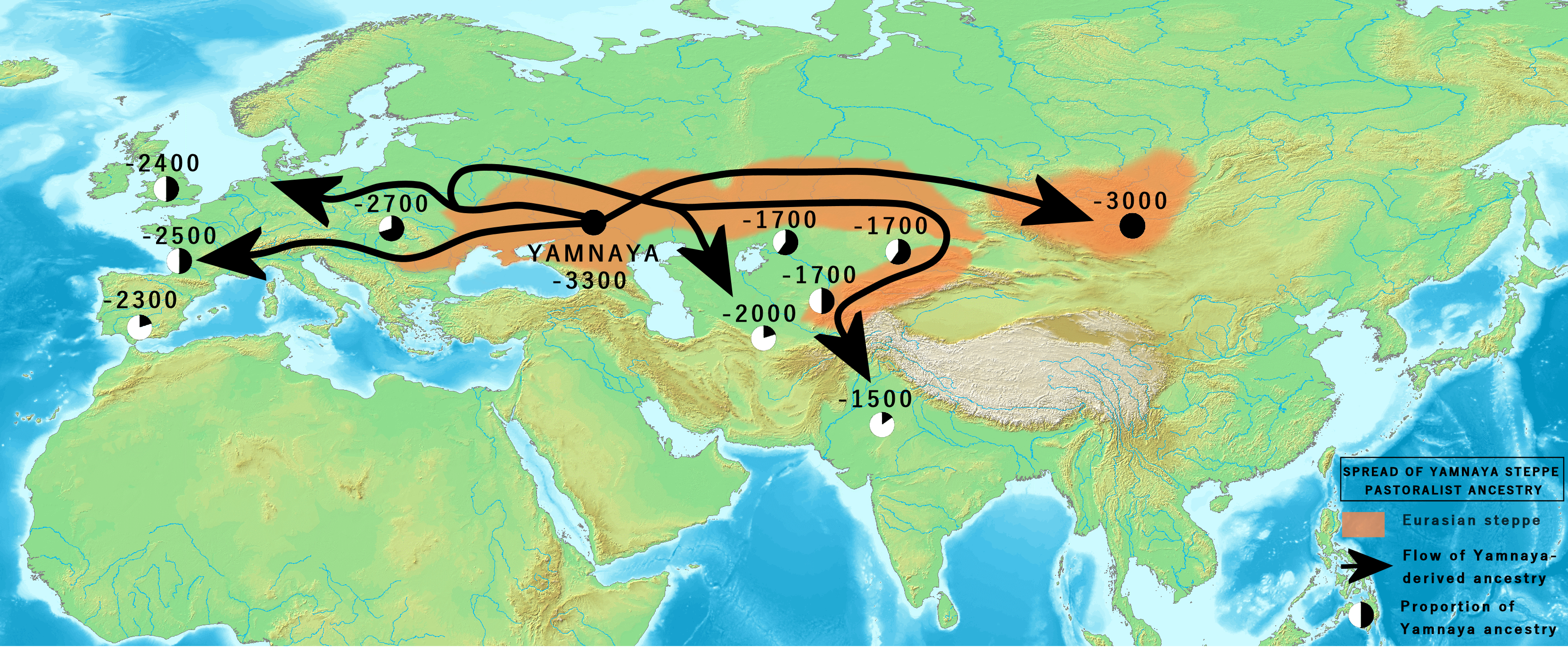
Bronze Age spread of Yamnaya Steppe pastoralist ancestry

Haak et al. (2015) studied DNA from 94 skeletons from Europe and Russia aged between 3,000 and 8,000 years old. They concluded that about 4,500 years ago there was a major influx into Europe of Yamnaya culture people originating from the Pontic–Caspian steppe north of the Black Sea and that the DNA of copper-age Europeans matched that of the Yamnaya.

The four Corded Ware people could trace an astonishing three-quarters of their ancestry to the Yamnaya, according to the paper. That suggests a massive migration of Yamnaya people from their steppe homeland into Eastern Europe about 4500 years ago when the Corded Ware culture began, perhaps carrying an early form of Indo-European language.

==== Bronze Age Greeks ====
A 2017 archaeogenetics study of Mycenaean and Minoan remains published in the journal Nature concluded that the Mycenaean Greeks were genetically closely related with the Minoans but unlike the Minoans also had a 13–18% genetic contribution from Bronze Age steppe populations.

=== Anatolian hypothesis ===
Luigi Luca Cavalli-Sforza and Alberto Piazza argue that Renfrew and Gimbutas reinforce rather than contradict each other. Cavalli-Sforza (2000) states that "It is clear that, genetically speaking, peoples of the Kurgan steppe descended at least in part from people of the Middle Eastern Neolithic who immigrated there from Turkey." Piazza & Cavalli-Sforza (2006) state that:

if the expansions began at 9,500 years ago from Anatolia and at 6,000 years ago from the Yamnaya culture region, then a 3,500-year period elapsed during their migration to the Volga-Don region from Anatolia, probably through the Balkans. There a completely new, mostly pastoral culture developed under the stimulus of an environment unfavourable to standard agriculture, but offering new attractive possibilities. Our hypothesis is, therefore, that Indo-European languages derived from a secondary expansion from the Yamnaya culture region after the Neolithic farmers, possibly coming from Anatolia and settled there, developing pastoral nomadism.

Spencer Wells suggests in a 2001 study that the origin, distribution and age of the R1a1 haplotype points to an ancient migration, possibly corresponding to the spread by the Kurgan people in their expansion across the Eurasian steppe around 3000 BC.

About his old teacher Cavalli-Sforza's proposal, Wells (2002:) states that "there is nothing to contradict this model, although the genetic patterns do not provide clear support either", and instead argues that the evidence is much stronger for Gimbutas' model:

While we see substantial genetic and archaeological evidence for an Indo-European migration originating in the southern Russian steppes, there is little evidence for a similarly massive Indo-European migration from the Middle East to Europe. One possibility is that, as a much earlier migration (8,000 years old, as opposed to 4,000), the genetic signals carried by Indo-European-speaking farmers may simply have dispersed over the years. There is clearly some genetic evidence for migration from the Middle East, as Cavalli-Sforza and his colleagues showed, but the signal is not strong enough for us to trace the distribution of Neolithic languages throughout the entirety of Indo-European-speaking Europe.

=== Iranian/Armenian hypothesis ===
David Reich (2018), noting the presence of some Indo-European languages (such as Hittite) in parts of ancient Anatolia, argues that "the most likely location of the population that first spoke an Indo-European language was south of the Caucasus Mountains, perhaps in present-day Iran or Armenia, because ancient DNA from people who lived there matches what we would expect for a source population both for the Yamnaya and for ancient Anatolians." Yet, Reich also notes that "...the evidence here is circumstantial as no ancient DNA from the Hittites themselves has yet been published." Kristian Kristiansen, in an interview with Der Spiegel in May 2018, stated that the Yamnaya culture may have had a predecessor at the Caucasus, where "proto-proto-Indo-European" was spoken.

Recent DNA-research has led to renewed suggestions of a Caucasian homeland for the 'proto-Indo-Europeans'. According to Kroonen et al. (2018) and Damgaard et al. (2018), ancient Anatolia "show no indication of a large-scale intrusion of a steppe population." They further note that this lends support to the Indo-Hittite hypothesis, according to which both proto-Anatolian and proto-Indo-European split-off from a common mother language "no later than the 4th millennium BCE." Haak et al. (2015) states that "the Armenian plateau hypothesis gains in plausibility" since the Yamnaya partly descended from a Near Eastern population, which resembles present-day Armenians."

Wang et al. (2018) note that the Caucasus served as a corridor for gene flow between the steppe and cultures south of the Caucasus during the Eneolithic and the Bronze Age, stating that this "opens up the possibility of a homeland of PIE south of the Caucasus." However, Wang et al. also comment that the most recent genetic evidence supports an expansion of proto-Indo-Europeans through the steppe, noting: "but the latest ancient DNA results from South Asia also lend weight to a spread of Indo-European languages "via the steppe belt. The spread of some or all of the proto-Indo-European branches would have been possible via the North Caucasus and Pontic region and from there, along with pastoralist expansions, to the heart of Europe. This scenario finds support from the well attested and now widely documented 'steppe ancestry' in European populations, the postulate of increasingly patrilinear societies in the wake of these expansions (exemplified by R1a/R1b), as attested in the latest study on the Bell Beaker phenomenon."

David W. Anthony in a 2019 analysis, criticizes the "southern" or "Armenian" hypothesis (addressing Reich, Kristiansen, and Wang). Among his reasons being: that the Yamnaya lack evidence of genetic influence from the Bronze Age or late neolithic Caucasus (deriving instead from an earlier mixture of Eastern European hunter-gatherers and Caucasus hunter-gatherers) and have paternal lineages that seem to derive from the hunter-gatherers of the Eastern European Steppe rather than the Caucasus, as well as a scarcity in the Yamnaya of the Anatolian Farmer admixture that had become common and substantial in the Caucasus around 5,000 BC. Anthony instead suggests a genetic and linguistic origin of proto-Indo-Europeans (the Yamnaya) in the Eastern European steppe north of the Caucasus, from a mixture of these two groups (EHG and CHG). He suggests that the roots of Proto-Indo-European ("archaic" or proto-proto-Indo-European) were in the steppe rather than the south and that PIE formed mainly from a base of languages spoken by Eastern European hunter-gathers with some influences from languages of Caucasus hunter-gatherers.

== See also ==
- Archaeogenetics
- Indo-Aryan migration
- Comparative linguistics
- Historical linguistics
- Paleolithic continuity theory
- Old European culture
- Proto-Indo-European language
- Proto-Indo-European religion
- Proto-Indo-European society
- Gravettian
- Sintashta culture

== Sources ==
Printed sources

- Anthony, David W.; Ringe, Don (January 2015). "The Indo-European Homeland from Linguistic and Archaeological Perspectives". Annual Review of Linguistics. 1 (1): 199–219. doi:10.1146/annurev-linguist-030514-124812. ISSN 2333-9683.
- Cavalli-Sforza, Luigi (2000). "Genes, Peoples, and Languages". Proceedings of the National Academy of Sciences of the United States of America. 94 (15): 7719–7724. Bibcode:1997PNAS...94.7719C. doi:10.1073/pnas.94.15.7719. ISBN 978-0-14-029602-0. PMC 33682. PMID 9223254.
- Haak, Wolfgang; Lazaridis, Iosif; Patterson, Nick; Rohland, Nadin; Mallick, Swapan; Llamas, Bastien; Brandt, Guido; Nordenfelt, Susanne; Harney, Eadaoin; Stewardson, Kristin; Fu, Qiaomei; Mittnik, Alissa; Bánffy, Eszter; Economou, Christos; Francken, Michael; Friederich, Susanne; Pena, Rafael Garrido; Hallgren, Fredrik; Khartanovich, Valery; Khokhlov, Aleksandr; Kunst, Michael; Kuznetsov, Pavel; Meller, Harald; Mochalov, Oleg; Moiseyev, Vayacheslav; Nicklisch, Nicole; Pichler, Sandra L.; Risch, Roberto; Rojo Guerra, Manuel A.; Roth, Christina (2015). "Massive migration from the steppe was a source for Indo-European languages in Europe". Nature. 522 (7555): 207–211. arXiv:1502.02783. Bibcode:2015Natur.522..207H. bioRxiv 10.1101/013433. doi:10.1038/nature14317. PMC 5048219. PMID 25731166.
- Jones, Eppie R. (2015). "Upper Palaeolithic genomes reveal deep roots of modern Eurasians". Nature Communications. 6 8912. Bibcode:2015NatCo...6.8912J. doi:10.1038/ncomms9912. PMC 4660371. PMID 26567969.
- Lazaridis, Iosif (2016), "Genomic insights into the origin of farming in the ancient Near East", Nature, 536 (7617): 419–424, Bibcode:2016Natur.536..419L, bioRxiv 10.1101/059311, doi:10.1038/nature19310, PMC 5003663, PMID 27459054
- Mallory, J. P. (1989). In Search of the Indo-Europeans: Language, Archaeology, and Myth. London: Thames & Hudson. ISBN 978-0-500-27616-7.
- Mallory, J. P. (1991). In Search of the Indo-Europeans: Language, Archaeology, and Myth. London: Thames & Hudson.
- Piazza, Alberto; Cavalli-Sforza, Luigi (15 April 2006). "Diffusion of Genes and Languages in Human Evolution". In Cangelosi, Angelo; Smith, Andrew D. M.; Smith, Kenny (eds.). The Evolution of Language: Proceedings of the 6th International Conference on the Evolution of Language (EVOLANG6). Rome: World Scientific. pp. 255–266. Archived from the original on 10 September 2007.
- Pamjav (December 2012), "Brief communication: New Y-chromosome binary markers improve phylogenetic resolution within haplogroup R1a1", American Journal of Physical Anthropology, 149 (4): 611–615, Bibcode:2012AJPA..149..611P, doi:10.1002/ajpa.22167, PMID 23115110
- Reich, David (2018). Who We Are and How We Got Here: Ancient DNA and the New Science of the Human Past. Knopf Doubleday Publishing Group.
- Strazny, Philipp (Ed). (2000), Dictionary of Historical and Comparative Linguistics (1 ed.), Routledge, ISBN 978-1-57958-218-0
- Thapar, Romila (1996), "The Theory of Aryan Race and India: History and Politics", Social Scientist, 24 (1/3): 3–29, doi:10.2307/3520116, JSTOR 3520116
- Thapar, Romila (2019), "Multiple Theories about the 'Aryan'", Which of Us Are Aryans?, ALEPH
- Watkins, Calvert (2000), "Indo-European and the Indo-Europeans", The American Heritage Dictionary of the English Language (4th ed.), Houghton Mifflin Company, archived from the original on 1 March 2009
- Wells, Spencer (2002). The Journey of Man: A Genetic Odyssey. Princeton University Press. ISBN 978-0-691-11532-0.

Web-sources
