= Balkan hypothesis =

Balkan hypothesis may refer to:

- A theory in the history of the Romanian language (Rösler theory); see Origin of Romanians#Migration from the south
- A theory (Renfrew 1999) placing Proto-Indo-European proper in the Balkans at a time of around 5000 BC; see Anatolian hypothesis
