= The Arctic Home in the Vedas =

1903 book by Bal Gangadhar Tilak

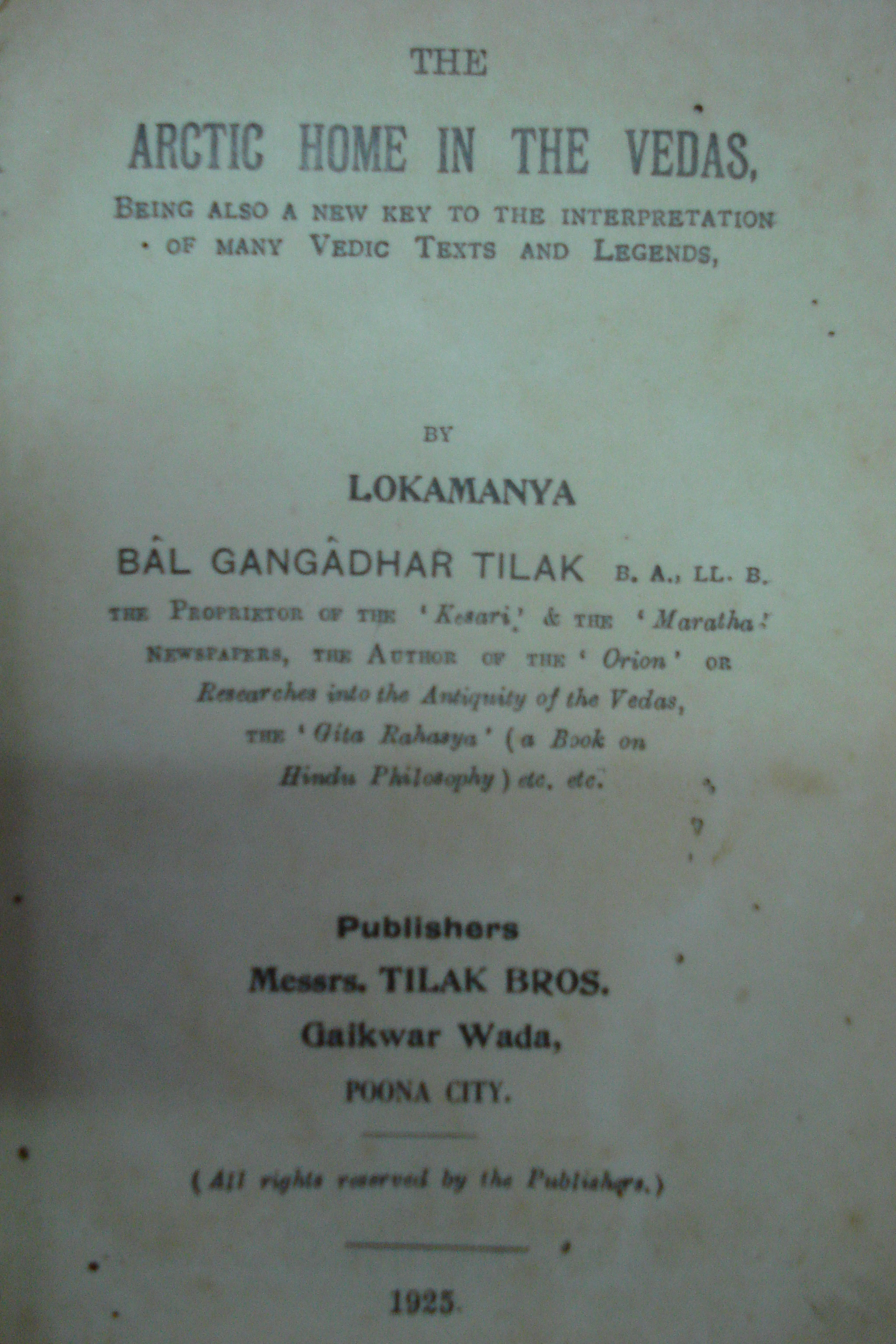
- The title page of the 1925 edition of The Arctic Home in the Vedas
- Author: Bal Gangadhar Tilak
- Language: English
- Subject: History
- Publication date: 1903
- Publication place: India
- Media type: Print (hardback)
- Pages: 340
- ISBN: 9781907166341

The Arctic Home in the Vedas is a 1903 book by Indian nationalist, teacher and independence activist Bal Gangadhar Tilak on the origin of the Aryans. Based on his analysis of Vedic hymns, Avestan passages, Vedic chronology and Vedic calendars, Tilak argued that the North Pole was the original home of Aryans during the pre-glacial period, which they left due to climate changes around 8000 B.C., migrating to the northern parts of Europe and Asia.

The ideas conceived in the book, while being at odds with the fringe science Out of India theory and pointing to a migratory origin of the Indo-Aryan peoples, are presently considered pseudoscientific, mostly for relying on antiquated notions of continental upheaval and climate history. Nonetheless, according to the current view, the taiga-originating Eastern hunter-gatherers did contribute a significant ancestral component to the Indo-Aryans, who have later migrated to the Indian subcontinent.

== Publication ==
The book was written at the end of 1898, but was first published in March 1903 in Pune. Tilak cited a book by first Boston University president William F. Warren, Paradise Found or the Cradle of the Human Race at the North Pole, as having anticipated his ideas.

== Tilak's Arctic homeland hypothesis ==
Tilak in his study

According to Tilak, writing at the end of the 19th century, the Neolithic Aryan race in Europe cannot be regarded as autochthonous, nor did the European Aryans descend from the Paleolithic man. Hence, the question of the original Aryan home is regarded as unsettled by Tilak.

According to Tilak, the close of the Pliocene and the whole of the Pleistocene period were marked by violent changes of climate bringing on what is called the glacial and inter-glacial epochs. In the early geological ages, the Alps were low, the Himalayas not yet upheaved, Asia and Africa were represented only by a group of islands and an equable and uniform climate prevailed over the whole surface of the globe. A succession of cold and warm climates must have characterized these glacial and inter-glacial periods which were also accompanied by extensive movements of depression and elevation of land, the depression taking place after the land was weighed down with the enormous mass of ice. Thus a period of glaciations was marked by elevation, extreme cold and the invasion of the ice-caps over regions of the present temperate zone; while an inter-glacial period was accompanied by depression of land and milder and congenial climate which made even the Arctic habitable. The geographical distribution of land and water on the earth during the inter-glacial period was quite different from what it is at present.

The Arctic was inhabited by the Aryans. The ending of the glacial age changed the climate there, and set the Aryan people on a migration to new habitats. The coming on of the last glacial age that destroyed this warm congenial climate and rendered the regions unsuited for the habitation of tropical plants and animals. The post-glacial commenced at about 10,000 years ago or 8,000 BC. The surviving Aryans left the Arctic, searching for new lands to settle.

Characteristics of an Arctic home, characterised by a climate different from today's, are clearly recorded in several Vedic hymns and Avestic passages. There are descriptions of the prevailing conditions and of the day-to-day experience, but also recordings of stories told by the earlier generation, sometimes presented as myths. Tilak gives the following chronology of the post-glacial period:

- 10,000 to 8000 BC – The destruction of the original Arctic home by the last ice age and the commencement of the post-Glacial period.
- 8000 to 5000 BC – The age of migration from the original home. The survivors of the Aryan race roamed over the northern parts of Europe and Asia in search of lands suitable for new settlements. Tilak calls it the Pre-Orion Period.
- 5000 to 3000 BC. – The Orion period, when the vernal equinox was in Orion. Many Vedic hymns can be traced to the early part of this period and the bards of the race seem to have not yet forgotten the real importance of the traditions of the Arctic home inherited by them. It was at this time that first attempts to reform the calendar and the sacrificial system appear to have been systematically made.
- 3000 to 1400 BC – The Krittika period, when the vernal equinox was in Pleiades. The traditions about the original Arctic home had grown dim by this time and were often misunderstood, making the Vedic hymns less and less intelligible.
- 1400 to 500 BC – The Pre-Buddhistic period, when the Sutras and the Philosophical systems made their appearance.

== Influence ==
M. S. Golwalkar, in his 1939 publication We or Our Nationhood Defined, famously stated that "Undoubtedly [...] we – Hindus – have been in undisputed and undisturbed possession of this land for over eight or even ten thousand years before the land was invaded by any foreign race." Golwalkar was inspired by Tilak's The Arctic Home in the Vedas. (Note: Carol Schaeffer: "Tilak, dubbed the "father of Indian unrest" for his advocacy of violent tactics against British colonialists and inspiration to later Indian Hindu nationalists".) Gowalkar took over the idea of 10,000 years, arguing that the North Pole at that time was located in India. (Note: See also Is our civilisation really 10 millennia old? Or are we simply insecure?; Sanjeev Sabhlok (2013), Not to be outdone by Müller, Tilak proposed that Aryans descended from the north pole. and Golwalkar's most fantastic and absurd attempt to “prove” that the non-existent Aryans were from India.)

Tilak's ideas influenced Soviet Indologist Natalya Romanovna Guseva and Soviet ethnographer S.V. Zharnikova, who argued for a northern Urals Arctic homeland of the Indo-Aryan and Slavic people; their ideas were popularized by Russian nationalists.

Robin Waterfield asserts that the book was influential on the esotericism of the Italian philosopher Julius Evola.

The French metaphysician René Guénon (1886–1951), like Tilak, considered that the Vedas were of North Pole origin. (Note: René Guénon wrote several works on Hinduism: Introduction to the Study of the Hindu Doctrines, Man and His Becoming According to the Vedanta, The Multiple States of Being …, all of which have been translated and published in English.) Thus, in October 1929, he wrote an article entitled Atlantis and Hyperborea, in which he argues that "the traditions to be Nordic, and even more exactly to be polar, since this is expressly affirmed in the Veda as well as in other sacred books." In a note, he then mentions Tilak's work in these terms:

Those who want precise references here can find them in the remarkable work of B.G. Tilak, The Arctic Home in the Veda, which seems unfortunately to have remained completely unknown in Europe, no doubt because its author was a non Westernized Hindu.

More recently, in 1987, Jean Haudry (1934–2023), French linguist and Indo-Europeanist referred to Tilak's book, in which he endorses his postulate concerning the North European hypothesis.

== See also ==
- Anatolian hypothesis
- Ancient North Eurasians
- Arctic
- Ariana
- Armenian hypothesis
- Aryan
- Aryan race
- Aryavarta
- Atlantis
- Hyperborea
- Indigenous Aryanism
- Indo-Aryan languages
- Indo-Aryan migrations
- Indo-Aryan peoples
- Indo-Aryans
- Indo-Iranian languages
- Indo-Iranians
- Kumari Kandam
- Kurgan
- Kurgan hypothesis
- Lemuria (continent)
- Mu (lost continent)
- Paleolithic continuity theory
- Rigveda
- The Orion (book)
- Thule
- Vedic Age

== Sources ==
- Ashalatha, A.; Koropath, Pradeep; Nambarathil, Saritha (2009). "6 – Indian National Movement" (PDF). Social Science: Standard VIII Part 1. Government of Kerala • Department of Education. State Council of Educational Research and Training (SCERT).
- Pandey, Gyanendra (2006), Routine Violence: Nations, Fragments, Histories, Stanford University Press
- Schaeffer, Carol (2018), "Alt-Reich. The unholy alliance between India and the new global wave of white supremacy", The Caravan
- Schnirelman, Victor (2007), "Archaeology, Russian Nationalism, and the "Arctic Homeland"" (PDF), in Kohl, P. L.; Kozelsky, M.; Ben-Yehuda, N. (eds.), Selective Remembrances: Archaeology in the Construction, Commemoration, and Consecration of National Pasts, University of Chicago Press
- Waterfield, Robin (1990). "Baron Julius Evola and the Hermetic Tradition". Gnosis. No. 14. pp. 12–17.
