= Neolithic creolisation hypothesis =

Archaeological hypothesis

The Neolithic creolisation hypothesis, first put forward by Marek Zvelebil in 1995, situates the Proto-Indo-European Urheimat in northern Europe in Neolithic times at the Baltic coast, proposing that migrating Neolithic farmers mixed with indigenous Mesolithic hunter-gatherer communities, resulting in the genesis of the Indo-European language family.

The hypothesis holds that the linguistic and cultural influence of the Neolithic farmers was far greater than the persistence of their foreign gene pool. According to Zvelebil, the linguistic influence of indigenous hunter-gatherers predominated, but other archeologists, such as Marek Nowak, favor a scenario compatible to Colin Renfrew's Anatolian hypothesis in attributing the leading linguistic role to the foreign farmers.

== Archaeological evidence ==
A study of strontium isotope signatures among the Neolithic farmers in Southwestern Germany indicated that the first Linear Pottery culture farmers received their partners from a wide catchment, were patrilocal and intermarried with hunter-gatherer women along the agricultural frontier. The appearance of Mesolithic motifs on the first Funnel Beaker culture pottery and of other elements in the material culture has been adduced in support of such results.

It was theorized the intermarriage between the two communities resulted in the breakdown of the early farming Linear Pottery culture and the Lengyel culture social and ideological structure as well as a subsequent development of a new foraging-farming community, which was identified archaeologically as the Funnel Beaker culture. That caused the combination of cultural traditions of earlier foraging and farming generations to be accomplished in an act of cultural creolisation. In the Polish Plain, the pattern persisted during some 2500 years, between 4400 and 1800 BC or 2200 BC, until the last hunter-gatherer communities finally became part of the Globular Amphorae/Corded Ware cultural horizon. They led to a cognitive structure that was more familiar to the indigenous hunter-gatherer community but still retained certain earlier routine practices of both the ancestral Neolithic and Mesolithic traditions. The cultural variability of the Funnel Beaker culture horizon and the later Globular Amphorae and Corded Ware traditions was proposed to be caused, at least partially, by that process.

== Anthropological evidence ==
A more anthropological perspective is proposed to confirm the concept of farmer communities being "acculturated" by neighboring foragers. Investigations revealed low palaeodemographic values of Linear Pottery farmers and Corded Ware culture populations with dominant agricultural occupations. The highest values correspond to Corded Ware culture populations, using a husbandry mode of production.

== Linguistic evidence ==
Frederik Kortlandt's assessment takes into account the typological similarity of Proto-Indo-European to the Northwest Caucasian languages. Assuming that the similarity can be attributed to areal factors, Kortlandt thought of Indo-European as a branch of Uralo-Altaic that was transformed under the influence of a Caucasian-like substratum. Kortlandt had in mind areal factors that would be essentially in agreement with the Kurgan hypothesis and an origin in the eastern part of the Great European Plain.

That should be kept distinct from linguist Peter Schrijver's speculation on the residual lexical and typological features of a family of languages featuring complex verbs, a structural type of which the Northwest Caucasian languages are the sole survivors in the region, which he links to the archeological Linear Pottery culture, the first farmers in Europe. Under the Anatolian hypothesis, they are supposed to have been Indo-European-speaking, but Schrijver's proposal, like Kortlandt's, is compatible with the Kurgan paradigm, as Schrijver suggests they spoke languages from a completely different family, which typologically resembled Hattic, Minoan and Northwest Caucasian. The family is presumed to have not influenced any Indo-European language spoken in the steppes, but to have influenced Indo-European languages spoken in Central and Southeastern Europe (Germanic, Celtic, Italic and Greek) during the Bronze and the Iron Ages.
