= Archaeoastronomy and Vedic chronology =

The history of Indian astronomy begins with the Vedic period, Lagadha and composition of Vedanga Jyotisha (1400 BCE - 1200 BCE). Astronomical knowledge in India reached an early peak in the 5th century CE, with the Āryabhaṭīya. Its author, Aryabhata, mentions that when he turned 23 years of age, 3600 years had passed since the beginning of Kali Yuga. This date has become traditional and is still widely cited in Hindu literature to suggest the date of Kurukshetra War.

Modern authors attempted to date the Vedic period based on archaeoastronomical calculations. In the 18th century William Jones tried to show, based on information gathered from Varaha Mihira, that Parashara muni lived at 1181 BCE. Hermann Jacobi has argued that in the Rigveda and Atharvaveda the sun was in Phalguni, and in the Sankhayana and Gobhila Grhyasutra the Full moon was in Bhadrapada during the summer solstice, which would have occurred at 4500-2500 BCE.

Jacobi and Tilak have both argued that the names of the nakṣatras: Mūla (root), Viśṛtau (two dividers) and Jyeṣṭha (oldest) suggest that these names originated from a time when Mula marked the beginning of the year, i.e. about 4500-2500 BCE. Tilak has also noted that the two week long pitrs period after the full moon in Bhadrapada occurred at the beginning of the pitryana, which would have been true at about 4500-2500 BCE.

== Samhitas ==
In RV 5.40.5-9, a solar eclipse is referred to: Surya is obscured by an Asura called Svarbhanu ("self-luminous"), but recovered by the Atris.

The samvatsara "full year" in the Yajurveda has 360 days, and 12 (TS) or 13 (VS) months.

== Brahmanas ==
The visuvant (summer solstice) period is 21 days in Aitreya Br. and 7 days in Pancavimsa Br., the summer solstice being in the middle of the period.

The gavam ayana ritual in SB 4.6.2. is based on the motion of the sun.

In the Maitrayana Brahmana Upanishad (6.14), the year is said to be into two portions, with the part from Magha to half of Śraviṣṭha associated with Agni, and the part from Sārpa to half of Śraviṣṭha associated with Varuna and Saumya (the moon). Aiyar has argued that Agni suggests the warm half and similarly Varuna the cool half of the year, suggesting the summer solstice at the beginning of Maghā and thus implying the vernal equinox in Kṛttikā. This, according to Kak, would correspond to 1660 BCE.

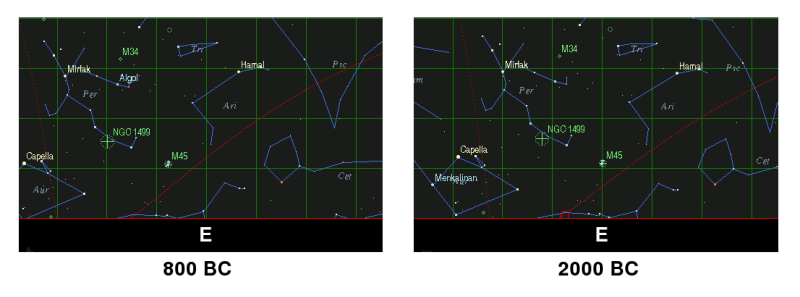
rising of the Pleiades (M45) as seen from Delhi in 800 BC and 2000 BC (click to enlarge).

The Shatapatha Brahmana mentions that the Krttikas (the Pleiades) "do not swerve from the east". This would have been the case with precision at 2950 BCE and was true also about 2000 BCE, but was still true to within 8-13 degrees (viz., East by north) around the 8th to 6th centuries BCE, the assumed date of the text's composition.

== Vedanga Jyotisa ==
The positions of the solstices and equinoxes in the Vedanga Jyotisha, with the sun very close to the Krittika at the Vernal Equinox., would correspond to about 1370 BCE, although the text in its present form is from a later date, around 700 - 600 BCE.

The Vedanga Jyotisha, in common with Mesopotamian texts, asserts a 3:2 ratio between the durations of daylight on the longest and shortest days of the year. This corresponds to a latitude of about 35 degrees. A latitude of 34 degrees would correspond to Northern India.

== See also ==
- Hindu astrology
- Indian astronomy
- Hindu Time Cycles

== Literature ==
- Bryant, Edwin (2001), The Quest for the Origins of Vedic Culture, Oxford University Press
- David Frawley. 1991. Gods, Sages, and Kings, Lotus Press, Twin Lakes, Wisconsin ISBN 0-910261-37-7
- Kak, Subhash, The Astronomical Code of the Rigveda (1994, 2000).
- Tilak, Bal Gangadhar. The Orion, or, Researches into the antiquities of the Vedas, The Arctic Home in the Vedas, Vedic Chronology and Vedanga Jyotisha. Poona: Messrs Tilak Bros.
- Gondhalekar, Prabhakar (2017). "Śatapatha Brāhamaṇa II.1.2.3; a Coincidence or a Challenge?". Zeitschrift der Deutschen Morgenländischen Gesellschaft. 167 (2): 381–397. doi:10.13173/zeitdeutmorggese.167.2.0381. ISSN 0341-0137.
