= Lothar Kilian =

German archaeologist (1911–2000)

- Born: 12 October 1911; Nidden, East Prussia, Kingdom of Prussia, German Empire (now Nida, Lithuania)
- Died: 12 March 2000 (aged 88)

Academic background
- Education: University of Königsberg

Academic work
- Discipline: Archaeology; Linguistics
- Institutions: University of Bonn; Rheinisches Landesmuseum Trier
- Main interests: Balts; Germanic peoples; Proto-Indo-European homeland

Lothar Kilian (12 October 1911 – 12 March 2000) was a German archaeologist and linguist, who researched Balts, Germanic peoples and the Proto-Indo-European homeland.

== Biography ==
Lothar Kilian was born in Nidden, Prussia, Germany, (after 1919 Memelland (Klaipėda Region), then Nida, Lithuania) on 12 October 1911. He gained his Ph.D. in archaeology at the University of Königsberg in 1939. After World War II, Kilian worked at the University of Bonn and at the Rheinisches Landesmuseum Trier. Kilian authored a number of works on the origins of the Balts and Germanic peoples, and the Proto-Indo-European homeland. His studies on these subjects were important. He died on 12 March 2000.

== Selected works ==
- Haffküstenkultur und Ursprung der Balten, 1955
- Zu Herkunft und Sprache der Prussen:, 1980
- Zum Ursprung der Indogermanen, 1983
- Zum Ursprung der Germanen, 1988

== See also ==
- Marija Gimbutas
- J. P. Mallory
