= Berezhnovka =

Berezhnovka Бережновка
- Selo
- Location within Volgograd Oblast Location within Russia
- Coordinates: 50°15′N 45°53′E
- Country: Russia
- Region: Volgograd Oblast
- District: Nikolayevsky District
- Time zone: UTC+4:00

Berezhnovka (Russian: Бережновка) is a rural locality (a selo) and the administrative center of Berezhnovskoye Rural Settlement, Nikolayevsky District, Volgograd Oblast, Russia. The population was 1,639 as of 2010. There are 26 streets.

== Geography ==
Berezhnovka is located on Transvolga, on the east bank of the Volgograd Reservoir, 46 km northeast of Nikolayevsk (the district's administrative centre) by road. Politotdelskoye is the nearest rural locality.
