= Anatolian hypothesis =

Theory of origin of Proto-Indo-Europeans

The Anatolian hypothesis, also known as the Anatolian theory or the sedentary farmer theory, first developed by British archaeologist Colin Renfrew in 1987, proposes that the dispersal of Proto-Indo-Europeans originated in Neolithic Anatolia. It is the main competitor to the Kurgan hypothesis, or steppe theory, which enjoys more academic favor.

== Description ==
The Anatolian hypothesis suggests that the speakers of Proto-Indo-European (PIE) lived in Anatolia during the Neolithic era. It associates the distribution of historical Indo-European languages with the expansion during the Neolithic Revolution of the 7th and the 6th millennia BC.

The hypothesis states that Indo-European languages began to spread peacefully, by demic diffusion, into Europe from Asia Minor from around 7000 BC with the Neolithic advance of farming (wave of advance). Accordingly, most inhabitants of Neolithic Europe would have spoken Indo-European languages, and later migrations would have replaced the Indo-European varieties with other Indo-European varieties.

The expansion of agriculture from the Middle East would have diffused three language families: Indo-European languages toward Europe, Dravidian languages toward Pakistan and India, and Afroasiatic languages toward the Arabian Peninsula and North Africa. Reacting to criticism, Renfrew revised his proposal to the effect of taking a pronounced Indo-Hittite position. Renfrew's revised views place only Pre-Proto-Indo-European in the 7th millennium BC in Anatolia, proposing as the homeland of Proto-Indo-European proper the Balkans around 5000 BC, which he explicitly identified as the "Old European culture", proposed by Marija Gimbutas. He thus still locates the original source of the Indo-European languages in Anatolia around 7000 BC.

Reconstructions of a Bronze Age PIE society, based on vocabulary items like "wheel", do not necessarily hold for the Anatolian branch, which may have separated at an early stage, prior to the invention of wheeled vehicles.

Map showing the Neolithic expansion from the seventh to fifth millennium BC

According to Renfrew (2004), the spread of Indo-European proceeded in the following steps:

- Around 6500 BC: Pre-Proto-Indo-European, in Anatolia, splits into Anatolian and Archaic Proto-Indo-European, the language of the Pre-Proto-Indo-European farmers who migrate to Europe in the initial farming dispersal. Archaic Proto-Indo-European languages occur in the Balkans (Starčevo–Körös culture), in the Danube valley (Linear Pottery culture), and possibly in the Bug-Dniestr area (Eastern Linear pottery culture).
- Around 5000 BC: Archaic Proto-Indo-European splits into Northwestern Indo-European (the ancestor of Italic, Celtic, and Germanic), in the Danube valley, Balkan Proto-Indo-European (corresponding to Gimbutas' Old European culture) and Early Steppe Proto-Indo-European (the ancestor of Tocharian).

The main strength of the farming hypothesis lies in its linking of the spread of Indo-European languages with an archaeologically known event, the spread of farming, which scholars often assume involved significant population shifts.

== Bayesian analysis ==
Research published in 2003 of "87 languages with 2,449 lexical items" by Russell Gray and Quentin Atkinson found an age range for the "initial Indo-European divergence" of 7800 to 9800 years, which was found to be consistent with the Anatolian hypothesis. Using stochastic models to evaluate the presence or absence of different words across Indo-European, Gray & Atkinson (2003) concluded that the origin of Indo-European goes back about 8500 years, the first split being that of Hittite from the rest (Indo-Hittite hypothesis).

In 2006, the authors of the paper responded to their critics. In 2011, the authors and S. Greenhill found that two different datasets were also consistent with their theory. An analysis by Ryder and Nicholls (2011) found support for the Anatolian hypothesis:

Our main result is a unimodal posterior distribution for the age of Proto-Indo-European centred at 8400 years before Present with 95% highest posterior density interval equal to 7100–9800 years before Present.

Bouckaert et al. (2012), including Gray and Atkinson, conducted a computerized phylogeographic study, using methods drawn from the modeling of the spatial diffusion of infectious diseases; it also showed strong support for the Anatolian hypothesis despite having undergone corrections and revisions. Colin Renfrew commented on this study, stating that "[f]inally we have a clear spatial picture."

== Criticism ==
=== Bayesian analysis ===
Bayesian analysis has been criticized on account of its inferring the lifespan of a language from that of some of its words; the idiosyncratic outcome of, for example, the Albanian language raises doubts about the method and the data.

The linguist Andrew Garrett, commenting on Bouckaert et al. (2012), stated, "There is bias in the underlying data that leads to an erroneous conclusion, and strong evidence that is ignored which still strongly supports the Kurgan hypothesis." According to David Anthony, "this type of model doesn't match the complex linguistic and archaeological evidence." He added, "The study is an example of retrofitting evidence to a model, but the results of such a model are only as useful as the underlying data and assumptions."

The linguist Paul Heggarty, from the Max Planck Institute, wrote in 2014:

"Bayesian analysis has come to be widely used in archaeological chronologies.... Its application to linguistic prehistory, however, has proved controversial, in particular on the issue of Indo-European origins. Dating and mapping language distributions back into prehistory has an inevitable fascination, but has remained fraught with difficulty. This review of recent studies highlights the potential of increasingly sophisticated Bayesian phylogenetic models, while also identifying areas of concern, and ways in which the models might be refined to address them. Notwithstanding these remaining limitations, in the Indo-European case the results from Bayesian phylogenetics continue to reinforce the argument for an Anatolian rather than a Steppe origin."

Chang et al. (2015) also conducted a lexicostatistical (and some glottochronological) study, which produced results different from the results produced by Gray and Atkinson. The study instead supported the Kurgan hypothesis.

=== Dating ===
Piggot (1983) states that PIE contains words for technologies that make their first appearance in the archaeological record in the Late Neolithic, in some cases bordering on the early Bronze Age, some belonging to the oldest layers of PIE. The lexicon includes words relating to agriculture (dated to 7500 BC), stockbreeding (6500 BC), metallurgy (5500 BC), the plough (4500 BC), gold (4500 BC), domesticated horses (4000–3500 BC) and wheeled vehicles (4000–3400 BC). Horse breeding is thought to have originated with the Sredny Stog culture, semi-nomadic pastoralists living in the forest steppe zone, now in Ukraine. Wheeled vehicles are thought to have originated with Funnelbeaker culture in what is now Poland, Belarus and parts of Ukraine.

According to Mallory and Adams (2006), linguistic analysis shows that the Proto-Indo-European lexicon seems to include words for a range of inventions and practices related to the Secondary Products Revolution, which postdates the early spread of farming. On lexico-cultural dating, Proto-Indo-European cannot be earlier than 4000 BC.

According to Anthony and Ringe (2015) the main objection to the Anatolian hypothesis is that it requires an unrealistically early date. Most estimates date Proto-Indo-European between 4500 and 2500 BC, with the most probable date around 3700 BC. It is unlikely that late PIE, even after the separation of the Anatolian branch, postdates 2500 BC, as Proto-Indo-Iranian is usually dated to just before 2000 BC. On the other hand, it is not very likely that early PIE predates 4500 BC, as the reconstructed vocabulary strongly suggests a culture of the terminal phase of the Neolithic bordering on the early Bronze Age.

=== Linguistics ===
Many Indo-European languages have cognate words meaning axle: Latin axis, Lithuanian ašis, Russian: os', and Sanskrit: ákṣa. (In some, a similar root is used for the word armpit: eaxl in Old English, axilla in Latin, and kaksa in Sanskrit.) All of them are linked to the PIE root *h₂eḱs-. The reconstructed PIE root *yeu-g- gives rise to Old High German joh, juh, Hittite iukan, Latin iugum, Greek ζυγόν, zygón and Sanskrit yugá(m), all meaning yoke. Words for wheel and cart/wagon/chariot take one of two common forms, thought to be linked with two PIE roots: the root *kʷel- "move around" is the basis of the unique derivative *kʷekʷlo- "wheel" which becomes hvél (wheel) in Old Icelandic, kolo (wheel, circle) in Old Church Slavonic, kãkla- (neck) in Lithuanian, κύκλος, kýklos (wheel, circle) in Greek, cakka-/cakra- (wheel) in Pali and Sanskrit, and kukäl (wagon, chariot) in Tocharian A. The root *ret(h)- becomes rad (wheel) in Old High German, rota (wheel) in Latin, rãtas (wheel) in Lithuanian and ratha (wagon, chariot) in Sanskrit.

=== Farming ===
The idea that farming in Western Eurasia was spread from Anatolia in a single wave has been revised. Instead, it appears to have spread in several waves by several routes, primarily from the Levant. The trail of plant domesticates indicates an initial foray from the Levant by sea. The overland route via Anatolia seems to have been most significant in spreading farming to Southeastern Europe.

=== Genetics ===
A genetic study from the Universitat Autònoma de Barcelona (2015) favors Gimbutas's Kurgan hypothesis over Renfrew's Anatolian hypothesis but "does not reveal the precise origin of PIE, nor does it clarify the impact Kurgan migrations had on different parts of Europe".

Lazaridis et al. (2016) noted on the origins of Ancestral North Indians:

"Nonetheless, the fact that we can reject West Eurasian population sources from Anatolia, mainland Europe, and the Levant diminishes the likelihood that these areas were sources of Indo-European (or other) languages in South Asia."

However, Lazaridis et al. previously admitted being unsure "if the steppe is the ultimate source" of the Indo-European languages and believe that more data is needed.

Archaeologist Kristian Kristiansen argues that the combination of recent linguistic research and evidence from ancient DNA studies has 'largely falsified' the Anatolian hypothesis. Linguist Alwin Kloekhorst has stated that the confirmation by recent ancient DNA studies of massive migrations from the steppe to areas of Europe and Asia means that "no one can seriously uphold the Anatolian hypothesis for Classical Proto-Indo-European anymore."

== See also ==
- Armenian hypothesis
- Indo-Hittite
- Kurgan hypothesis
- Neolithic Europe
- Neolithic Revolution
- Paleolithic continuity theory

== Sources ==
- Anthony, David; Ringe, Don (2015). "The Indo-European Homeland from Linguistic and Archaeological Perspectives". Annual Review of Linguistics. 1: 199–219. doi:10.1146/annurev-linguist-030514-124812.
- Atkinson, Quentin D.; Gray, Russel D. (2006). "Chapter 8: How Old is the Indo-European Language Family? Illumination or More Moths to the Flame?". In Forster, Peter; Renfrew, Colin (eds.). Phylogenetic Methods and the Prehistory of Languages. Cambridge: McDonald Institute for Archaeological Research. pp. 91–109. ISBN 978-1-902937-33-5.
- Bouckaert, Remco; Lemey, Philippe; Dunn, Michael; Greenhill, Simon J.; Alekseyenko, Alexander V.; Drummond, Alexei J.; Gray, Russel; Suchard, Marc A.; Atkinson, Quentin D. (August 2012). "Report: Mapping the Origins and Expansion of the Indo-European Language Family". Science. 337 (6097): 957–960. Bibcode:2012Sci...337..957B. doi:10.1126/science.1219669. PMC 4112997. PMID 22923579.
- Chang, Will; Cathcart, Chundra; Hall, David; Garrett, Andrew (2015). "Ancestry-constrained Phylogenetic Analysis Supports the Indo-European Steppe Hypothesis". Language. 91 (1): 194–244. doi:10.1353/lan.2015.0005. S2CID 143978664.
- Coward, Fiona; et al. (January 2008). "The Spread of Neolithic Plant Economies from the Near East to Northwest Europe: A Phylogenetic Analysis". Journal of Archaeological Science. 35 (1): 42–56. Bibcode:2008JArSc..35...42C. doi:10.1016/j.jas.2007.02.022.
- Gray, Russell D.; Atkinson, Quentin D.; Greenhill, Simon J. (April 2011). "Language Evolution and Human History: What a Difference a Date Makes". Philosophical Transactions of the Royal Society. 366 (1567): 1090–1100. doi:10.1098/rstb.2010.0378. PMC 3049109. PMID 21357231.
- Gray, Russel D.; Atkinson, Quentin D. (2003). "Language-tree Divergence Times Support the Anatolian Theory of Indo-European Origin". Nature. 426 (6965): 435–439. Bibcode:2003Natur.426..435G. doi:10.1038/nature02029. PMID 14647380. S2CID 42340.
- Heggarty, Paul (June 2014). "Prehistory by Bayesian Phylogenetics? The State of the Art on Indo-European Origins". Antiquity. 88 (340): 566–577. doi:10.1017/S0003598X00101188. hdl:11858/00-001M-0000-0013-F692-A. S2CID 161589461.
- Holm, Hans J. (2007). "The New Arboretum of Indo-European "Trees" – Can New Algorithms Reveal the Phylogeny and even Prehistory of IE?" (PDF). Journal of Quantitative Linguistics. 14 (2): 167–214. doi:10.1080/09296170701378916. S2CID 42273748. Archived from the original (PDF) on 8 May 2018.
- Lazaridis, Iosif; et al. (2016). "Genomic insights into the origin of farming in the ancient Near East". Nature. 536 (7617): 419–424. Bibcode:2016Natur.536..419L. bioRxiv 10.1101/059311. doi:10.1038/nature19310. PMC 5003663. PMID 27459054.
- Mallory, J.P.; Adams, D.Q. (2006). The Oxford Introduction to Proto-Indo-European and the Proto-Indo-European World. Oxford: Oxford University Press. ISBN 9780191058127.
- Özdogan, Mehmet (October 2011). "Archaeological Evidence on the Westward Expansion of Farming Communities from Eastern Anatolia to the Aegean and the Balkans". Current Anthropology. 52 (Supplement 4): S415–S430. Bibcode:2011CurrA..52S.415O. doi:10.1086/658895. S2CID 143684285.
- Piggott, Stuart (1983). The Earliest Wheeled Transport: From the Atlantic Coast to the Caspian Sea. Ithaca, NY: Cornell University Press. ISBN 978-0-80-141604-0.
- Pinhasi, Ron; Fort, Joaquim; Ammerman, Albert J. (2005). "Tracing the Origin and Spread of Agriculture in Europe". PLOS Biology. 3 (12 [e410]): 2220–2228. doi:10.1371/journal.pbio.0030410. PMC 1287502. PMID 16292981.
- Pringle, Heather (24 August 2012). "News & Analysis: New Method Puts Elusive Indo-European Homeland in Anatolia". Science. 337 (6097): 902. doi:10.1126/science.337.6097.902. PMID 22923555.
- Renfrew, Colin (1990) [1987]. Archaeology and Language: The Puzzle of Indo-European Origins. Cambridge: Cambridge University Press. ISBN 978-0-52-138675-3.
- Renfrew, Colin (2003). "Time Depth, Convergence Theory, and Innovation in Proto-Indo-European: 'Old Europe' as a PIE Linguistic Area". In Bammesberger, Alfred; Vennemann, Theo (eds.). Languages in Prehistoric Europe. Heidelberg: Universitätsverlag Winter GmbH. pp. 17–48. ISBN 978-3-82-531449-1.
- Ryder, Robin J.; Nicholls, Geoff K. (January 2011). "Missing Data in a Stochastic Dollo Model for Binary Trait Data, and its Application to the Dating of Proto-Indo-European" (PDF). Journal of the Royal Statistical Society, Series C. 60 (1): 71–92. doi:10.1111/j.1467-9876.2010.00743.x. S2CID 118853910.
