= Kristian Kristiansen (archaeologist) =

Danish archaeologist

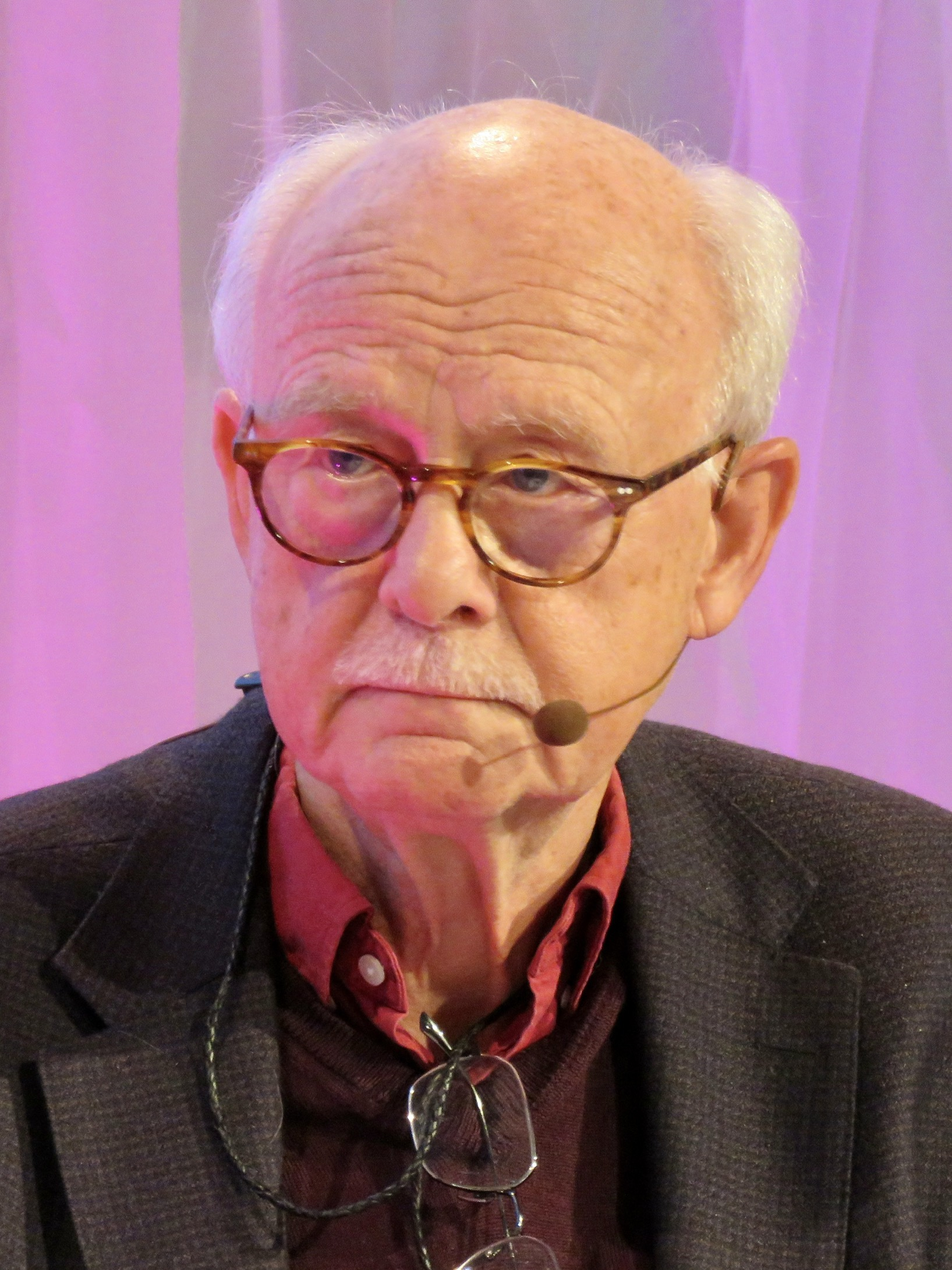
Kristian Kristiansen

Kristian Kristiansen FSA FSA Scot (born 21 August 1948) is a Danish archaeologist known for his contributions to the study of Bronze Age Europe, heritage studies and archaeological theory. He is a professor at the University of Gothenburg.

== Education and career ==
Kristiansen was born in Hyrup on 21 August 1948. He studied prehistoric archaeology at Aarhus University and the University of Copenhagen, obtaining his Special Magister Thesis from Aarhus University in 1975, and his Dr Phil at Aarhus University in 1998 on his synthesis "Europe Before History". He was the director of the Danish Archaeological Heritage Administration from 1979 to 1994, and since then has been a professor at the University of Gothenburg.

Kristiansen initiated the founding of the European Association of Archaeologists in 1994, and served as its first president until 1998. He was also the founding editor the European Journal of Archaeology. He has held visiting professorships at the Sorbonne, Stanford University, the University of Cambridge and the University of Oxford.

== Awards and honours ==
- Knight of the Order of the Dannebrog, 1985
- Honorary fellow of the Society of Antiquaries of Scotland, 1991
- Member of the Royal Society of Sciences and Letters in Gothenburg, 1994
- Foreign member of the Royal Swedish Academy of Letters, History and Antiquities, 2002
- European Archaeological Heritage Prize, 2005
- Society for American Archaeology Book Award, 2007 (for The Rise of Bronze Age Society)
- Honorary fellow of the Society of Antiquaries of London, 2009
- British Academy Grahame Clark Medal, 2016

== Selected publications ==
- Kristiansen, Kristian (1998). Europe Before History. Cambridge: Cambridge University Press.
- —; Larsson, Thomas B. (2005). The Rise of Bronze Age Society: Travels, Transmissions and Transformations. Cambridge: Cambridge University Press.
