= Aryan =

Self-designation used by ancient Indo-Iranian peoples

Aryan (/ˈɛəriən/), or Arya (borrowed from Sanskrit ārya), is a term originating from the self-designation of the Indo-Iranians. It stood in contrast to nearby outsiders, whom they designated as non-Aryan (*an-āryā). In ancient India, the term was used by the Indo-Aryan peoples of the Vedic period both as an endonym and in reference to a region called Aryavarta (lit. 'Land of the Aryans'), (Note: Sanskrit: आर्यावर्त, romanized: Āryāvarta) where their culture emerged. Similarly, according to the Avesta, the Iranian peoples used the term to designate themselves as an ethnic group and to refer to a region called Airyanem Vaejah (lit. 'Expanse of the Arya'), (Note: Avestan: 𐬀𐬌𐬭𐬌𐬌𐬀𐬥𐬆𐬨 𐬬𐬀𐬉𐬘𐬀𐬵, romanized: Airyanəm Vaēǰah) which was their mythical homeland. The word stem also forms the etymological source of place names like Alania (*Aryāna) and Iran (*Aryānām).

Although the stem *arya may originate from the Proto-Indo-European language, it seems to have been used exclusively by the Indo-Iranian peoples, as there is no evidence of it having served as an ethnonym for the Proto-Indo-Europeans. The view of many modern scholars is that the ethos of the ancient Aryan identity, as it is described in the Avesta and the Rigveda, was religious, cultural, and linguistic, and was not tied to the concept of race.

In the 1850s, the French diplomat and writer Arthur de Gobineau brought forth the idea of the "Aryan race", essentially claiming that the Proto-Indo-Europeans were superior specimens of humans and that their descendants comprised either a distinct racial group or a distinct sub-group of the hypothetical Caucasian race. Through the work of his later followers, such as the British-German philosopher Houston Stewart Chamberlain, Gobineau's theory proved to be particularly popular among European racial supremacists and ultimately laid the foundation for Nazi racial theories, which also co-opted the concept of scientific racism. Adolf Hitler drew on vague ideas that the Aryans in ancient India were lighter-skinned and taller than their neighbors, and that, after relocating, they cultivated and bore all of the cultural creativity of Europe.

In Nazi Germany, and also in German-occupied Europe during World War II, any citizen who was classified as an Aryan would be honoured as a member of the "master race" of humanity. Conversely, non-Aryans were legally discriminated against, including Jews, Roma, and Slavs (mostly Poles and Russians). Jews, who were regarded as the arch enemy of the "Aryan race" in a "racial struggle for existence", were especially targeted by the Nazi Party, culminating in the Holocaust. The Roma, who are of Indo-Aryan origin, were also targeted, culminating in the Porajmos. The genocides and other large-scale atrocities that have been committed by Aryanists have led academic figures to generally avoid using "Aryan" as a stand-alone ethno-linguistic term, particularly in the Western world, where "Indo-Iranian" is the preferred alternative, although the term "Indo-Aryan" is still used to denote the Indic branch.

== Etymology ==
=== English and European languages ===
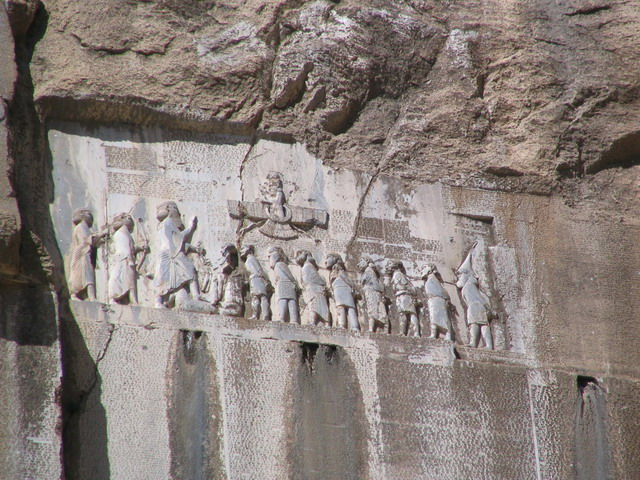
One of the earliest epigraphically attested reference to the word arya occurs in the 6th-century BCE Behistun inscription, which describes itself as having been composed "in arya [language or script]" (§ 70). As is also the case for all other Old Iranian language usage, the arya of the inscription does not signify anything but "Iranian".

The term Arya was first rendered into a modern European language in 1771 as Aryens by French Indologist Abraham-Hyacinthe Anquetil-Duperron, who rightly compared the Greek arioi with the Avestan airya and the country name Iran. In Germany, Johann Friedrich Kleuker's translation of Anquetil-Duperron's work led to the introduction of the term Arier in 1776.

The Sanskrit word ā́rya is rendered as 'noble' in William Jones' 1794 translation of the Indian Laws of Manu. The English Aryan (originally spelt Arian) appeared a few decades later, first as an adjective in 1839, then as a noun in 1849, probably after the German Arier (noun), arisch (adjective). During the 19th and early 20th centuries, the meaning varied between the broader category equivalent to Indo-European, and the narrower one equivalent to Indo-Iranian.

Use of Aryan to designate a "white non-Jewish person, especially one of northern European origin or descent" entered the English language from German, after this meaning was introduced in 1887 and further developed by German anti-Semitic propagandists in the context of a so-called "Aryan race". It is still used in far-right and white supremacist discourse, and sometimes appears in the names of such groups.

=== Indo-Iranian ===
The Sanskrit word ā́rya (आर्य) was originally an ethnocultural term designating those who spoke Vedic Sanskrit and adhered to Vedic cultural norms (including religious rituals and poetry), in contrast to an outsider, or an-ā́rya ('non-Arya'). By the time of the Buddha (5th–4th century BCE), it took the meaning of 'noble'. In Old Iranian languages, the Avestan term airya (Old Persian ariya) was likewise used as an ethnocultural self-designation by ancient Iranian peoples, in contrast to an an-airya ('non-Arya'). It designated those who belonged to the 'Aryan' (Iranian) ethnic stock, spoke the language and followed the religion of the 'Aryas'.

These two terms derive from the reconstructed Proto-Indo-Iranian stem *arya- or *āryo-, which was probably the name used by the prehistoric Indo-Iranian peoples to designate themselves as an ethnocultural group. The term did not have any racial connotation, which only emerged later in the works of 19th-century Western writers. According to David W. Anthony, "the Rigveda and Avesta agreed that the essence of their shared parental Indo-Iranian identity was linguistic and ritual, not racial. If a person sacrificed to the right gods in the right way using the correct forms of the traditional hymns and poems, that person was an Aryan."

=== Proto-Indo-European ===
The Proto-Indo-European (PIE) origin of the Indo-Iranian stem arya- remains debated. A number of scholars, starting with Adolphe Pictet (1799–1875), have proposed to derive arya- from the reconstructed PIE term *h₂erós or *h₂eryós, variously translated as 'member of one's own group, peer, freeman'; as 'host, guest; kinsman'; or as 'lord, ruler'. However, the proposed Anatolian, Celtic and Germanic cognates are not universally accepted. In any case, the Indo-Iranian ethnic connotation is absent from the other Indo-European languages, which rather conceived the possible cognates of *arya- as a social status (a freeman or noble), and there is no evidence that Proto-Indo-European speakers had a term to refer to themselves as 'Proto-Indo-Europeans'.

- Early PIE: *h₂erós,
  - Anatolian: *ʔor-o-, 'peer, freeman',
    - Hittite: arā-, 'comrade, peer, companion, friend'; arawanni-, 'free, freeman (not being slave)'; natta ara, 'not proper to the community',
    - Lycian: arus-, 'citizens'; arawa-, 'freedom',
  - Late PIE: *h₂eryós,
    - Indo-Iranian: *arya-, 'Aryan, Indo-Iranian',
      - Old Indo-Aryan: árya-, 'Aryan, faithful to the Vedic religion'; aryá-, 'kind, favourable, true, devoted'; arí-, 'faithful; devoted person, ± kinsman';
      - Iranian: *arya-, 'Aryan, Iranian',
        - Avestan: airya- (pl. aire), 'Aryan, Iranian',
        - Old Persian: ariya-, 'Aryan, Iranian',
    - Celtic: *aryo-, 'freeman; noble'; or perhaps from *prio- ('first > prominent, eminent'),
      - Gaulish: ario-, 'freeman, lord; foremost',
      - Old Irish: aire, 'freeman, chief; noble';
    - Germanic *arjaz, 'noble, distinguished, esteemed',
      - Proto-Norse: arjosteʀ, 'foremost, most distinguished'.

The term *h₂er(y)ós may derive from the PIE verbal root *h₂er-, meaning 'to put together'. Oswald Szemerényi has also argued that the stem could be a Near-Eastern loanword from the Ugaritic ary ('kinsmen'), although J. P. Mallory and Douglas Q. Adams find this proposition "hardly compelling". According to them, the original PIE meaning had a clear emphasis on the in-group status of the "freemen" as distinguished from that of outsiders, particularly those captured and incorporated into the group as slaves. In Anatolia, the base word has come to emphasize personal relationship, whereas it took a more ethnic meaning among Indo-Iranians, presumably because most of the unfree (*anarya) who lived among them were captives from other ethnic groups.

== Historical usage ==
=== Prehistoric Proto-Indo-Iranians ===
The term *arya was used by Proto-Indo-Iranian speakers to designate themselves as an ethnocultural group, encompassing those who spoke the language and followed the religion of the Aryas (Indo-Iranians), as distinguished from the nearby outsiders known as the *Anarya ('non-Arya'). Indo-Iranians (Aryas) are generally associated with the Sintashta culture (2100–1800 BCE), named after the Sintashta archaeological site in Chelyabinsk Oblast, Russia. Linguistic evidence show that Proto-Indo-Iranian (Proto-Aryan) speakers dwelled in the Eurasian steppe, south of early Uralic tribes; the stem *arya- was notably borrowed into the Pre-Sámi language as *orja-, at the origin of oarji ('southwest') and årjel ('Southerner'). The loanword took the meaning 'slave' in other Finno-Permic languages, suggesting conflictual relations between Indo-Iranian and Uralic peoples in prehistoric times.

The stem is also found in the Indo-Iranian god *Aryaman, translated as 'Arya-spirited,' 'Aryanness,' or 'Aryanhood;' he was known in Vedic Sanskrit as Aryaman and in Avestan as Airyaman. The deity was in charge of welfare and the community, and connected with the institution of marriage. Through marital ceremonies, one of the functions of Aryaman was to assimilate women from other tribes to the host community. If the Irish heroes Érimón and Airem and the Gaulish personal name Ariomanus are also cognates (i.e. linguistic siblings sharing a common origin), a deity of Proto-Indo-European origin named *h₂eryo-men may also be posited.

=== Ancient times ===
==== Ancient India ====
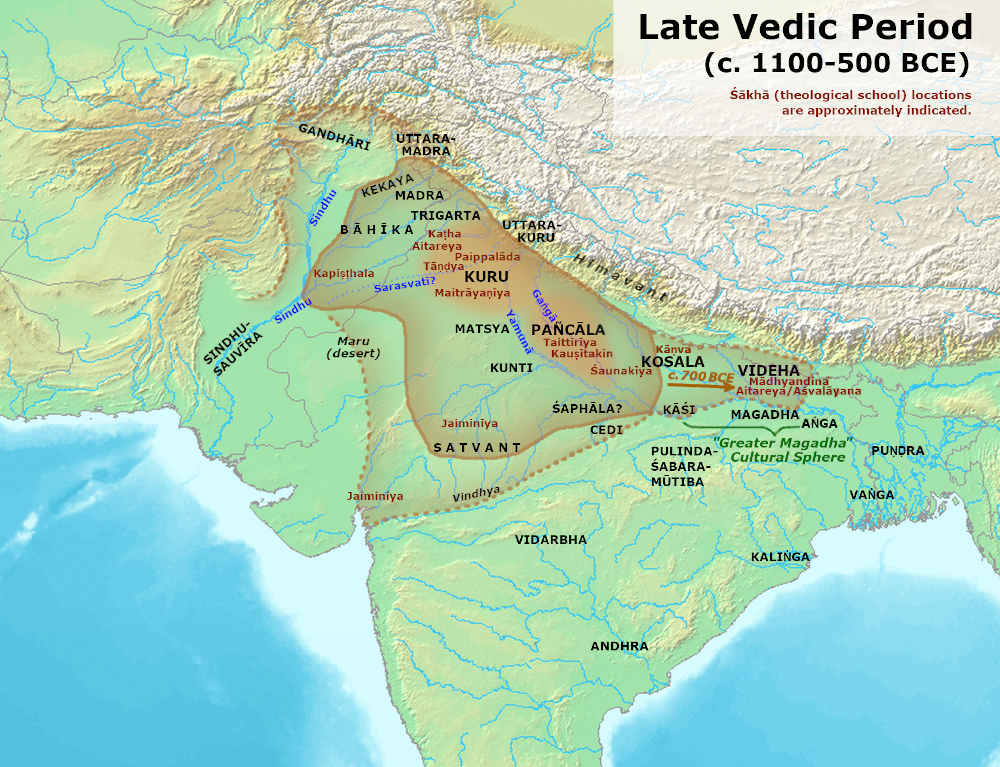
The approximate extent of Āryāvarta during the late Vedic period (ca. 1100–500 BCE). Aryavarta was limited to northwest India and the western Ganges plain, while Greater Magadha in the east was habitated by non-Vedic Indo-Aryans, who gave rise to Jainism and Buddhism.

Vedic Sanskrit speakers viewed the term ā́rya as a religious–linguistic category, referring to those who spoke the Sanskrit language and adhered to Vedic cultural norms, especially those who worshipped the Vedic gods (Indra and Agni in particular), took part in the yajna and festivals, and practiced the art of poetry.

The 'non-Aryas' designated primarily those who were not able to speak the āryā language correctly, the Mleccha or Mṛdhravāc. However, āryā is used only once in the Vedas to designate the language of the texts, the Vedic area being defined in the Kauṣītaki Āraṇyaka as that where the āryā vāc ('Ārya speech') is spoken. Some 35 names of Vedic tribes, chiefs and poets mentioned in the Rigveda were of 'non-Aryan' origin, demonstrating that cultural assimilation to the ā́rya community was possible, and/or that some 'Aryan' families chose to give 'non-Aryan' names to their newborns. In the words of Indologist Michael Witzel, the term ārya "does not mean a particular people or even a particular 'racial' group but all those who had joined the tribes speaking Vedic Sanskrit and adhering to their cultural norms (such as ritual, poetry, etc.)".

In later Indian texts and Buddhist sources, ā́rya took the meaning of 'noble', such as in the terms Āryadésa- ('noble land') for India, Ārya-bhāṣā- ('noble language') for Sanskrit, or āryaka- ('honoured man'), which gave the Pali ayyaka- ('grandfather'). The term came to incorporate the idea of a high social status, but was also used as an honorific for the Brahmana or the Buddhist monks. Parallelly, the Mleccha acquired additional meanings that referred to people of lower castes or aliens.

==== Ancient Iran ====
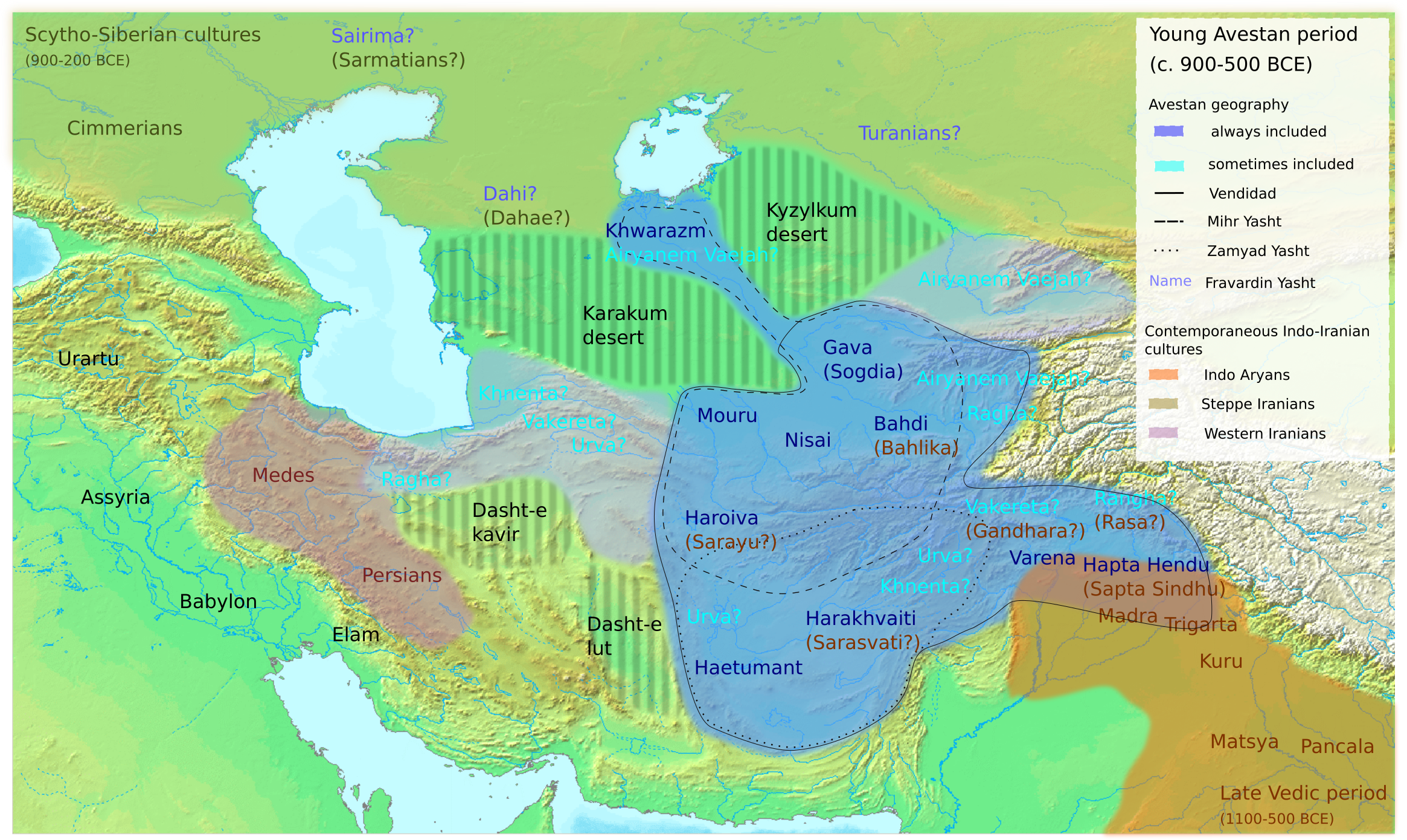
Approximate geographical extent of regions inhabited by the Arya of the Avesta vis-a-vis other Indo-Iranian peoples during the Young Avestan period (c. 900–500 BCE)

In the words of scholar Gherardo Gnoli, the Old Iranian airya (Avestan) and ariya (Old Persian) were collective terms denoting the "peoples who were aware of belonging to the one ethnic stock, speaking a common language, and having a religious tradition that centred on the cult of Ahura Mazdā", in contrast to the 'non-Aryas', who are called anairya in Avestan, anaryān in Parthian, and anērān in Middle Persian.

The people of the Avesta, exclusively used the term airya (Avestan: 𐬀𐬌𐬭𐬌𐬌𐬀, airiia) to refer to themselves. It can be found in a number geographical terms like the 'expanse of the airyas' (airiianəm vaēǰō), the 'dwelling place of the airyas' (airiio.shaiianem), or the 'white forest of the airyas' (vīspe.aire.razuraya). The term can also be found in poetic expressions such as the 'glory of the airyas' (airiianąm xᵛarənō), the 'most swift-arrowed of the airyas' (xšviwi išvatəmō airiianąm), or the 'hero of the airyas' (arša airiianąm). Although the Avesta does not contain any dateable events, modern scholarship assumes that the Avestan period mostly predates the Achaemenid period of Iranian history.

By the late 6th–early 5th century BCE, the Achaemenid king Darius the Great and his son Xerxes I described themselves as ariya ('Arya') and ariya čiça ('of Aryan origin'). In the Behistun inscription, authored by Darius during his reign (522 – 486 BCE), the Old Persian language is called ariya, and the Elamite version of the inscription portrays the Zoroastrian deity Ahura Mazdā as the "god of the Aryas" (ura-masda naap harriia-naum).

Darius at Behistun

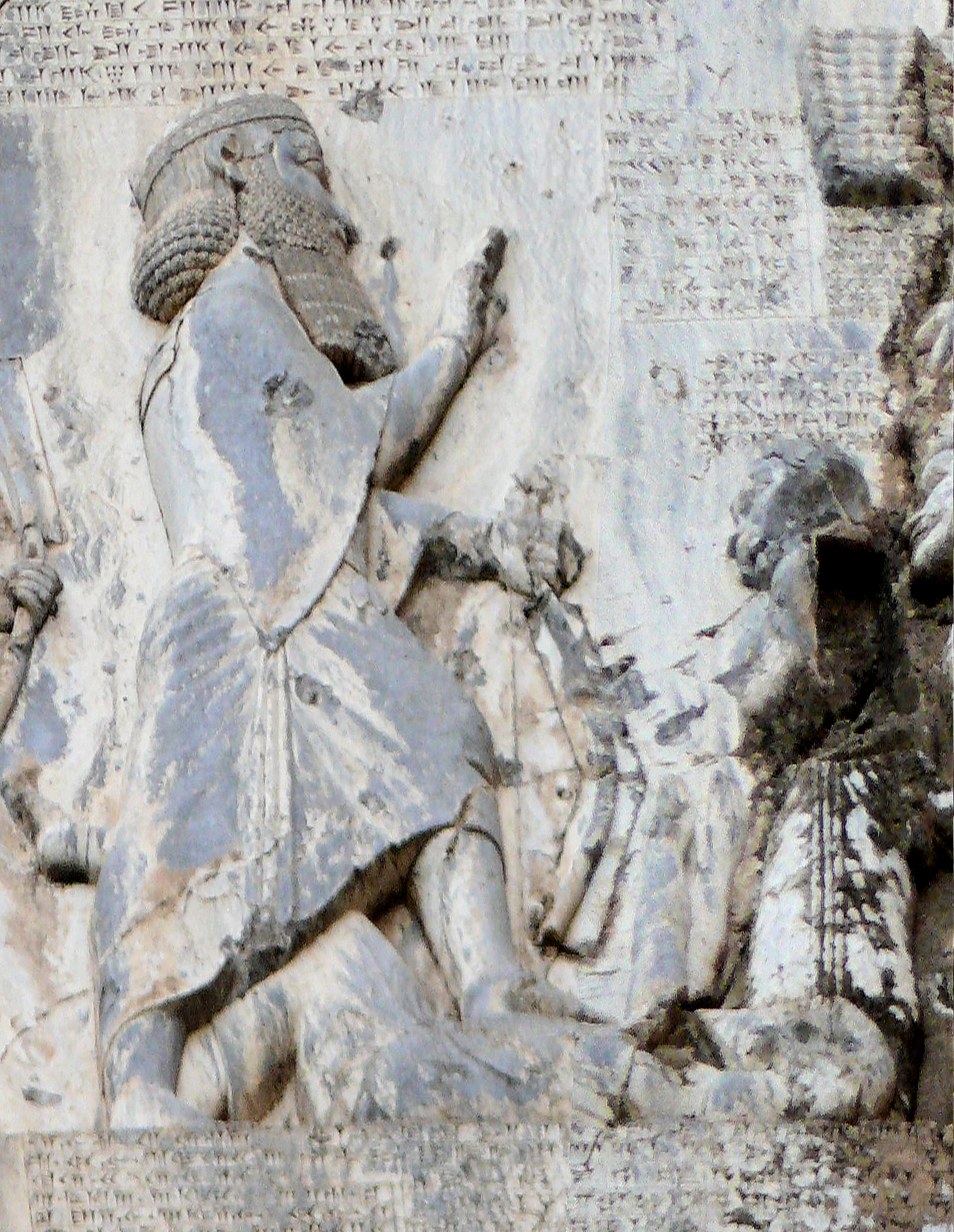
Full figure of Darius trampling rival Gaumata

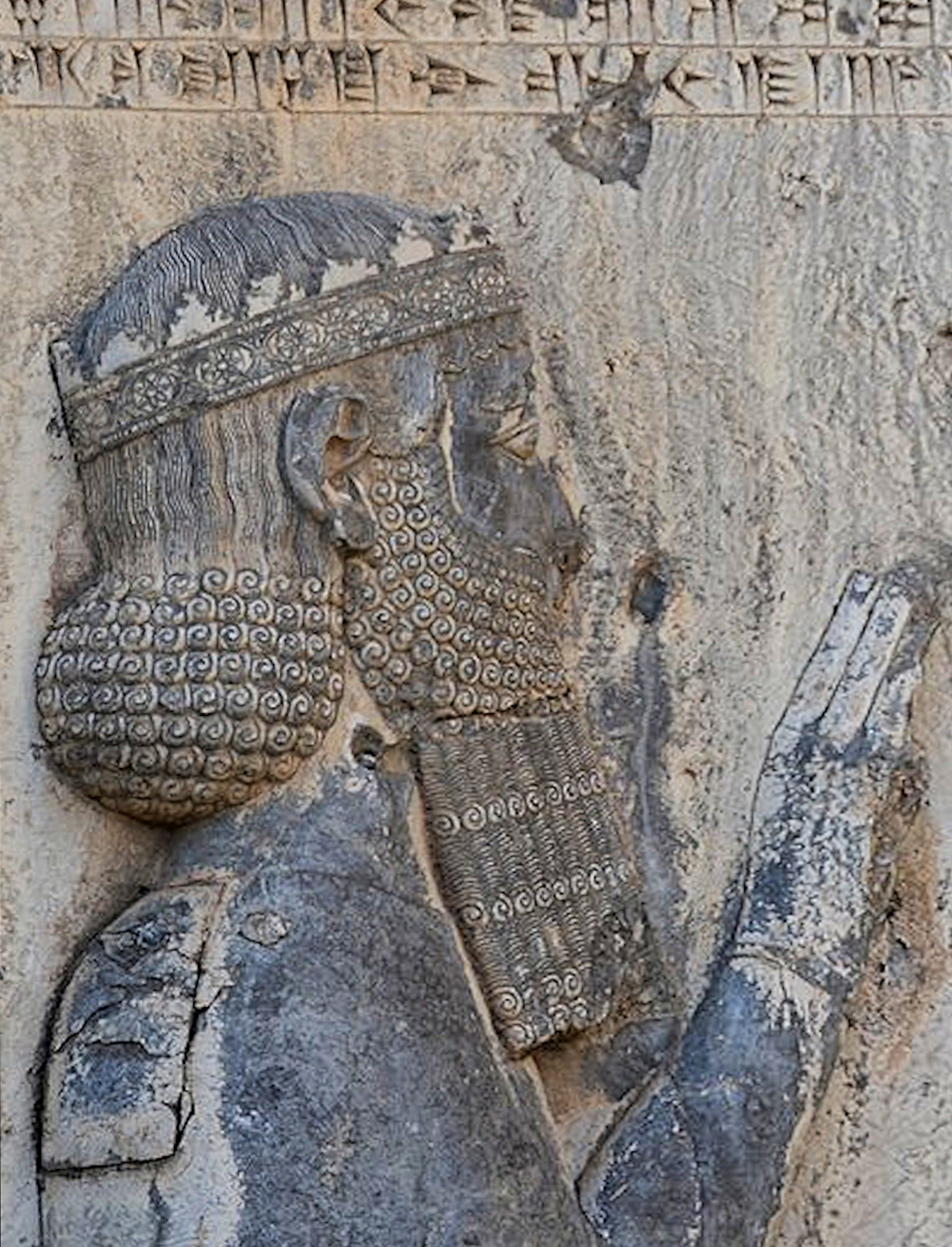
Head of Darius with crenellated crown

The self-identifier was inherited in ethnic names such as the Parthian Ary (pl. Aryān), the Middle Persian Ēr (pl. Ēran), or the New Persian Īrāni (pl. Īrāniyān). The Scythian branch has Alān or *Allān (from *Aryāna; modern Allon), Rhoxolāni ('Bright Alans'), Alanorsoi ('White Alans'), and possibly the modern Ossetian Ir (adj. Iron), spelled Irä or Erä in the Digorian dialect. The Rabatak inscription, written in the Bactrian language in the 2nd century CE, likewise uses the term ariao for 'Iranian'.

The name Arizantoi, listed by Greek historian Herodotus as one of the six tribes composing the Iranian Medes, is derived from the Old Iranian *arya-zantu- ('having Aryan lineage'). Herodotus also mentions that the Medes once called themselves Arioi, and Strabo locates the land of Arianē between Persia and India. Other occurrences include the Greek áreion (Damascius), Arianoi (Diodorus Siculus) and arian (pl. arianōn; Sasanian period), as well as the Armenian expression ari (Agathangelos), meaning 'Iranian'.

Until the demise of the Parthian Empire (247 BCE–224 CE), the Iranian identity was essentially defined as cultural and religious. Following conflicts between Manichean universalism and Zoroastrian nationalism during the 3rd century CE, however, traditionalistic and nationalistic movements eventually took the upper hand during the Sasanian period, and the Iranian identity (ērīh) came to assume a definite political value. Among Iranians (ērān), one ethnic group in particular, the Persians, were placed at the centre of the Ērān-šahr ('Kingdom of the Iranians') ruled by the šāhān-šāh ērān ud anērān ('King of Kings of the Iranians and non-Iranians').

Ethical and ethnic meanings may also intertwine, for instance in the use of anēr ('non-Iranian') as a synonymous of 'evil' in anērīh ī hrōmāyīkān ("the evil conduct of the Romans, i.e. Byzantines"), or in the association of ēr ('Iranian') with good birth (hutōhmaktom ēr martōm, 'the best-born Arya man') and the use of ērīh ('Iranianness') to mean 'nobility' against "labor and burdens from poverty" in the 10th-century Dēnkard. The Indian opposition between ārya- ('noble') and dāsá- ('stranger, slave, enemy') is however absent from the Iranian tradition. According to linguist Émile Benveniste, the root *das- may have been used exclusively as a collective name by Iranian peoples: "If the word referred at first to Iranian society, the name by which this enemy people called themselves collectively took on a hostile connotation and became for the Aryas of India the term for an inferior and barbarous people."

Old Persian names derived the stem *arya- include Aryabignes (*arya-bigna, 'Gift of the Aryans'), Ariarathes (*Arya-wratha-, 'having Aryan joy'), Ariobarzanēs (*Ārya-bṛzāna-, 'exalting the Aryans'), Ariaios (*arya-ai-, probably used as a hypocorism of the precedent names), or Ariyāramna (whose meaning remains unclear). The English Alan and the French Alain (from Latin Alanus) may have been introduced by Alan settlers to Western Europe during the first millennium CE.

==== Indo-Iranian place names ====
In ancient Sanskrit literature, the term Āryāvarta (आर्यावर्त, the 'abode of the Aryas') was the name given to the cradle of the Indo-Aryan culture in northern India. The Manusmṛiti locates Āryāvarta in "the tract between the Himalaya and the Vindhya ranges, from the Eastern (Bay of Bengal) to the Western Sea (Arabian Sea)".

The stem airya- also appears in Airyanəm Waēǰō (the 'stretch of the Aryas' or the 'Aryan plain'), which is described in the Avesta as the mythical homeland of the early Iranians, said to have been created as "the first and best of places and habitations" by the god Ahura Mazdā. It was referred to in Manichean Sogdian as ʾryʾn wyžn (Aryān Wēžan), and in Old Persian as *Aryānām Waiǰah, which gave the Middle Persian Ērān-wēž, said to be the region where the first cattle were created and where Zaraθuštra first revealed the Good Religion. The Sasanian Empire, officially named Ērān-šahr ('Kingdom of the Iranians'; from Old Persian *Aryānām Xšaθram), could also be referred to by the abbreviated form Ērān, as distinguished from the Roman West known as Anērān. The western variant Īrān, abbreviated from Īrān-šahr, is at the origin of the English country name Iran.

Alania, the name of the medieval kingdom of the Alans, derives from a dialectal variant of the Old Iranian stem *Aryāna-, which is also linked to the mythical Airyanem Waēǰō. Besides the ala- development, *air-y- may have turned into the stem ir-y- via an i-mutation in modern Ossetian languages, as in the place name Iryston (Ossetia), here attached to the Iranian suffix *-stān.

Other place names mentioned in the Avesta include airyō šayana, a movable term corresponding to the 'territory of the Aryas', airyanąm dahyunąm, the 'lands of the Aryas', Airyō-xšuθa, a mountain in eastern Iran associated with Ǝrəxša, and vīspe aire razuraya, the forest where Kavi Haosravō slew the god Vāyu.

==== Graeco-Latin literature ====
The word Arianus was used to designate Ariana, the area comprising Afghanistan, Iran, North-western India and Pakistan. In 1601, Philemon Holland used 'Arianes' in his translation of the Latin Arianus to designate the inhabitants of Ariana. This was the first use of the form Arian verbatim in the English language.

=== Modern times ===
==== Iranian nationalism ====
In the late Qajar era, modern ideas about the Aryan identity were introduced to Iran and significantly influenced its nationalistic movement. Iranian intellectuals, reflecting on their pre-Islamic, Indo-European past, embraced a version of the Aryan myth that contrasted their heritage with the Arab (or Semitic) influence introduced after the Arab conquest (7th century AD). In the 19th century, thinkers like Mirza Fatali Akhundov (1812–1878) and Mirza Aqa Khan Kermani (1854–1896) promoted the idea of a grand, ancient Persian civilization. This narrative, which depicted Arab influence as destructive to Iranian culture while emphasizing shared roots with admired European civilizations, was widely disseminated through nationalist publications and became a cornerstone of 20th-century Iranian nationalist discourse.

In Pahlavi Iran (1925–1979), nationalism was used to popularize the Aryan myth and promote Iranian antiquity, bolstering both national identity and the legitimacy of the ruling dynasty. This "Aryan and Neo-Achaemenid nationalism" emerged prominently in the 1930s and remained influential throughout the Pahlavi period. In 1935, Reza Shah mandated that the country be known internationally as 'Iran' (a name linked to the term 'Aryan') rather than 'Persia', which was seen as a foreign label derived from the southern province of Fars. His son, Mohammad Reza, later adopted the title "King of the Kings, Light of the Aryans" (Shahanshah Aryamehr), and in the 1970s, he even proposed an 'Aryan brotherhood' among Iran, India, Pakistan, and Afghanistan as a means to foster regional peace and celebrate a shared legacy of a distinguished civilization.

==== Religious use ====
The word ārya is often found in Hindu, Buddhist, and Jain texts. In the Indian spiritual context, it can be applied to Rishis or to someone who has mastered the four noble truths and entered upon the spiritual path. According to Indian leader Jawaharlal Nehru, the religions of India may be called collectively ārya dharma, a term that includes the religions that originated in the Indian subcontinent (e.g. Hinduism, Buddhism, Jainism and Sikhism).

The word ārya is also often used in Jainism, in Jain texts such as the Pannavanasutta. In Avaśyakaniryukti, an early Jaina text, a character named Ārya Mangu is mentioned twice.

==== Personal names ====
The name Aryan (including derivatives such as Aaryan, Arya, Ariyan or Aria) is still used as a given name or surname in modern South Asia and Iran. There has also been a rise in names associated with Aryan in the West, which have been popularized due to pop culture. According to the U.S. Social Security Administration in 2012, Arya was the fastest-rising girl's name in popularity in the U.S., jumping from 711th to 413th position. The name entered the top 200 most commonly used names for baby girls born in England and Wales in 2017.

== Scholarship ==
=== 19th and early 20th century ===
The term 'Aryan' was initially introduced into the English language through works of comparative philology, as a modern rendering of the Sanskrit word ā́rya. First translated as 'noble' in William Jones' 1794 translation of the Laws of Manu, early-19th-century scholars later noticed that the term was used in the earliest Vedas as an ethnocultural self-designation "comprising the worshipers of the gods of the Brahmans". This interpretation was simultaneously influenced by the presence of the word Ἀριάνης (Ancient Greek) ~ Arianes (Latin) in classical texts, which had been rightly compared by Anquetil-Duperron in 1771 to the Iranian airya (Avestan) ~ ariya (Old Persian), a self-identifier used by the speakers of Iranian languages since ancient times. Accordingly, the term 'Aryan' came to refer in scholarship to the Indo-Iranian languages, and, by extension, to the native speakers of the Proto-Indo-Iranian language, the prehistoric Indo-Iranian peoples.

During the 19th century, through the works of Friedrich Schlegel (1772–1829), Christian Lassen (1800–1876), Adolphe Pictet (1799–1875), and Max Müller (1823–1900), the terms Aryans, Arier, and Aryens came to be adopted by a number of Western scholars as a synonym of '(Proto-)Indo-Europeans'. Many of them indeed believed that Aryan was also the original self-designation used by the prehistoric speakers of the Proto-Indo-European language, based on the erroneous assumptions that Sanskrit was the oldest Indo-European language and on the linguistically untenable position that Ériu (Ireland) was related to Arya. This hypothesis has since been abandoned in scholarship due to the lack of evidence for the use of arya as an ethnocultural self-designation outside the Indo-Iranian world.

=== Contemporary scholarship ===
In contemporary scholarship, the terms 'Aryan' and 'Proto-Aryan' are still sometimes used to designate the prehistoric Indo-Iranian peoples and their proto-language. However, the use of 'Aryan' to mean 'Proto-Indo-European' is now regarded as an "aberration to be avoided". The 'Indo-Iranian' subfamily of languages – which encompasses the Indo-Aryan, Iranian, and Nuristani branches – may also be referred to as the 'Aryan languages'.

However, the atrocities committed in the name of Aryanist racial ideologies during the first part of the 20th century have led academics to generally avoid the term 'Aryan', which has been replaced in most cases by 'Indo-Iranian', although its Indic branch is still called 'Indo-Aryan'. The name 'Iranian', which stems from the Old Persian *Aryānām, also continues to be used to refer to specific ethnolinguistic groups.

- Indo-Aryan refers to the populations speaking an Indo-Aryan language or identifying as Indo-Aryan; they form the predominant group in Northern Indian subcontinent. The largest Indo-Aryan ethnolinguistic groups are Hindi–Urdu, Bengali, Punjabi, Marathi, Gujarati, Rajasthani, Bhojpuri, Maithili, Odia, and Sindhi. More than 900 million people are native speakers of an Indo-Aryan language.
- Iranian (or Iranic) is used to designate the speakers of Iranian languages or the peoples who identify as "Iranians", especially in Greater Iran. Modern Iranian ethnolinguistic groups include Persians, Pashtuns, Kurds, Tajiks, Balochs, Lurs, Pamiris, Zazas, and Ossetians. An estimated 150 to 200 million people are native speakers of an Iranian language.

Some authors writing for popular consumption have kept on using the word 'Aryan' for all Indo-Europeans in the tradition of H. G. Wells, such as the science fiction author Poul Anderson, and scientists writing for the popular media, such as Colin Renfrew. According to F. B. J. Kuiper, echoes of "the 19th century prejudice about 'northern' Aryans who were confronted on Indian soil with black barbarians [...] can still be heard in some modern studies."

== Aryanism and racism ==
=== Invention of the 'Aryan race' ===
==== Early Romantic views ====
During the Romantic era, thinkers such as Johann Gottfried Herder (1744–1803) and, later, Johann Gottlieb Fichte (1762–1814) developed the idea of a nation (Volk) as an organic cultural community rooted in shared history, folklore, myths, poetry, and especially a common language. They saw linguistic ties as natural evidence of tribal connections, linking a Volk's ancestry to the origins of its language. In this context, some European scholars began to interpret the newly established Indo-European linguistic connection as evidence of a shared cultural and ethnic heritage, at times drawing parallels between modern Europeans and ancient Persians. In 1808, Friedrich Schlegel, in Über die Sprache und Weisheit der Indier, proposed that the Indo-European languages (including Germanic) originated from a common ancestral tongue in ancient India or Persia. His work popularized the idea of a primordial "Indo-European people" (Urvolk) that had migrated westward from their 'original homeland' (Urheimat) in Asia.

==== North European hypothesis ====
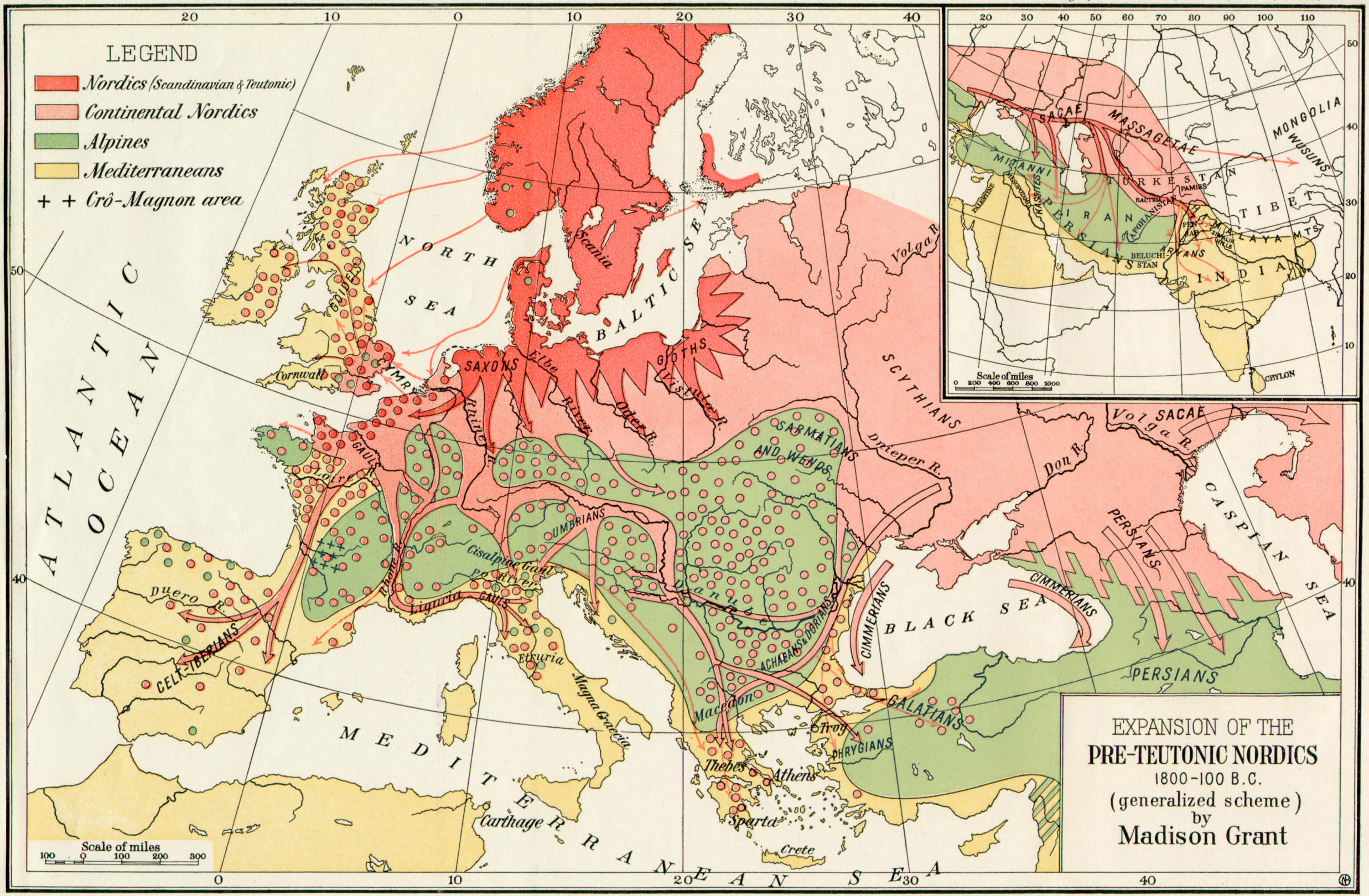
"Expansion of the Pre-Teutonic Nordics" — map from The Passing of the Great Race by Madison Grant, showing hypothesized migrations of Nordic peoples

In the second half of the 19th century, the idea that Indo-European languages had originated from Asia gradually lost ground in Western European scholarship. From the late 1860s onward, alternative models of Indo-European migrations began to emerge, some of them locating the ancestral homeland in Northern Europe. In 1868, Theodor Bensen proposed that the Aryans originated in Europe, and that some migrated to Asia to establish ancient Eastern civilisations, which he claimed had later "degenerated" through racial mixing on the periphery. This 'northern thesis' found growing support among German anthropologists and linguists such as Lazarus Geiger, Theodor Poesche, Ludwig Wilser, Karl Penka, and Gustaf Kossinna, and contributed to the emerging tendency to use the word Aryan as a synonym for Nordic or Germanic.

Karl Penka, credited as "a transitional figure between Aryanism and Nordicism", argued in 1868 that the Aryans originated in southern Scandinavia. In 1878, German-born anthropologist Theodor Poesche proposed locating the original Aryan homeland in Lithuania. In the early-20th century, German archaeologist Gustaf Kossinna (1858-1931), seeking to link prehistoric material cultures to the reconstructed Proto-Indo-European language, argued on archaeological grounds that the 'Indo-Germanic' (Indogermanische) migrations had originated from a homeland in northern Europe. Until the end of World War II, research on the Indo-European Urheimat broadly fell into two camps: Kossinna's followers, who favoured a northern European homeland, and those, initially led by Otto Schrader (1855–1919), who supported a Eurasian steppe homeland, the view that would later become dominant among scholars.

=== Theories of racial supremacy ===
==== Transition to racial biology ====
While Schlegel and early 19th-century proponents of Aryan migrations defined the Aryans in linguistic and cultural rather than biological terms, reflecting the influence of early national thinkers such as Herder, later scholars, including Julius Klaproth (1783–1835) and Frédéric Eichhoff (1799–1875), helped shift the concept of the ancient Aryans toward racial and biological interpretations. Racially-oriented interpretations of the Vedic Āryas as 'fair-skinned foreign invaders' coming from the North gradually paved the way for the adoption of the term Aryan as a racial category connected to a supremacist ideology known as Aryanism, which portrayed the Aryan race as a so-called 'superior race' responsible for most of the achievements of ancient civilizations.

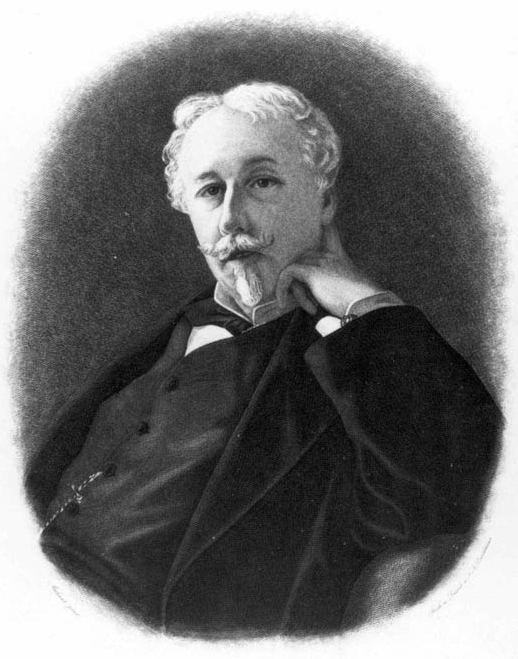
Arthur de Gobineau (1816–1882)

Arthur de Gobineau, author of the influential Essay on the Inequality of the Human Races (1853–1855), viewed the white race (and particularly its Aryan branch) as the only truly civilized one, conceiving cultural decline and miscegenation as intimately intertwined. Relocating the Aryans' origins from Asia to northern Europe, Gobineau argued that the ancient Aryans (an offshoot of the 'white race') had spread across the world and founded the great civilizations of antiquity, before degenerating through intermixture with the 'inferior' indigenous populations, which he saw as the primary cause of civilizational decay. The last 'pure' Aryans, he believed, were the Germanics. Gobineau divided humanity into three 'primary races' (white, yellow, and black) classifying both Aryans and Semites within the white race. In the decades following his work, however, the term Aryan increasingly came to be used in racialist discourse as a synonym for non-Jewish, a development that marked the transition from Gobineau's theory of racial hierarchy to the explicitly anti-Semitic Aryan ideology of the late 19th century.

==== Aryan race and antisemitism ====
Christian Lassen (1800–1876), a student of Schlegel, glorified the ancient Aryans as "the most gifted" and "perfect in talent", attributing to them an unparalleled cultural and intellectual refinement. He contrasted the Aryans with the Semites, helping establish an intellectual dichotomy between the two groups that would later take on racial overtones by subsequent writers on the topic. In this tradition, French orientalist Ernest Renan (1823–1892) portrayed the Semites as 'non-Aryans' and the Aryans as a creative and progressive race destined to lead human civilization. Similarly, Swiss linguist Adolphe Pictet (1799–1875) described the Aryans as the providential race and direct ancestors of Europeans. Influenced by Lassen and Renan, he depicted a fundamental moral and spiritual opposition between the Semitic and the superior Aryan peoples.

The first recorded instance of the German Arier to mean 'non-Jewish' appears to date from 1887, when a Viennese gymnastic society decided to admit only "Germans of Aryan descent" (Deutsche arischer Abkunft) as members. In The Foundations of the Nineteenth Century (1899), which Stefan Arvidsson notes is identified as "one of the most important proto-Nazi texts", British-German writer Houston Chamberlain envisioned an existential struggle between a superior German-Aryan race and a destructive Jewish-Semitic race, echoing Renan's antagonistic division between Aryans and Semites. Chamberlain's work was highly influential; German Emperor Wilhelm II personally praised it and recommended it as required reading for trainee teachers. The best-seller The Passing of the Great Race (1916), by American author Madison Grant in 1916, warned against miscegenation with the supposedly 'inferior' immigrant races – including speakers of Indo-European languages (such as Slavs, Italians, and Yiddish-speaking Jews) – which he believed threatened the 'racially superior' Germanic Aryans (that is: Americans of English, German, and Scandinavian descent).

Racial mysticists like Paul de Lagarde (1827–1891) and Julius Langbehn (1851–1907) idealized the Aryans as nature-bound, unspoilt Germanics (Urgermanen), opposed to the materialism, liberalism, and cosmopolitanism of modern society. Led by Guido von List (1848–1919) and Jörg Lanz von Liebenfels (1874–1954), the Ariosophists developed an ideological synthesis combining Völkisch nationalism with esoterism. Prophesying a coming era of German (Aryan) world domination, they maintained that a vast conspiracy against Germans – allegedly instigated by non-Aryan races, by the Jews, or by the early Church – had "sought to ruin this ideal Germanic world by emancipating the non-German inferiors in the name of a spurious egalitarianism".

=== Nazi racial theories ===
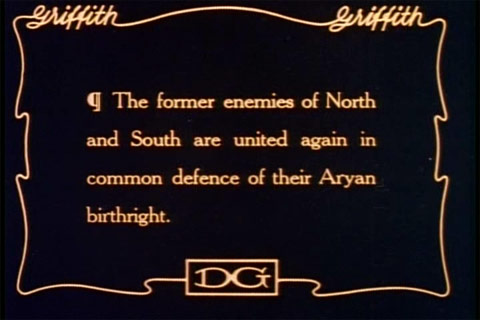
An intertitle from the silent film blockbuster The Birth of a Nation (1915). "Aryan birthright" is here "white birthright", the "defense" of which unites "whites" in the Northern and Southern U.S. against "coloreds". In another film of the same year, The Aryan, William S. Hart's "Aryan" identity is defined in distinction from other peoples.

Von Liebenfels and Houston Stewart Chamberlain — together with wider currents of social-Darwinist thought and late-19th-century racial anthropology — contributed important elements to Nazi racial ideology, especially notions of Aryan supremacy, racial struggle, and the imperative of racial purity. In Mein Kampf (1925), Adolf Hitler ideologically equated the ideal of the Aryan with the German people ('Volk'), presenting it as part of a non-Jewish, so-called 'master race', and framed a mythic history in which a Nordic Aryan people supposedly conquered foreign lands, founded great civilisations, and later declined through racial dilution. He cast strengthening the Aryan race as both a political and moral imperative, hereby legitimizing measures that suspended humanitarian and legal protections for groups labelled as inferior (Untermenschen). Such policies were defended as necessary for the 'survival' and advancement of the 'Aryans'. Jews were racialized as morally and biologically inferior people that needed to be eliminated, one way or another, from German society. Under the Nazi regime this translated into exclusionary laws, economic and social marginalisation, mass deportations and, ultimately, state-organised plans for systematic extermination.

==== Nazi views on Iranians ====
Alfred Rosenberg, a racial ideologue of the Nazi Party, expanded on the idea of an ancient Nordic migration in The Myth of the Twentieth Century (1930), portraying the ancient Persians as "Aryans with northern blood" who had eventually degenerated due to intermixing with so-called 'lower races' native to the region. In 1935, the Nazis founded the Ahnenerbe to research 'Aryan prehistory' through archaeological, anthropological, and linguistic studies. Its president, Walther Wüst, maintained that the Germans were directly descended from the Aryan 'Nordic race', which had spread into Asia. However, many Nazis classified modern Iranians as Aryans, or Ur-arier ("original Aryans"). Hans F. K. Günther claimed that modern Iranians "are the descendants and natural heirs of the old Iranians." He stated many Iranians still contained Nordic blood, although Hither Asiatic admixture was also present; Günther further claimed that Iranians have a European mentality. In the same vein, Hitler declared Iran to be an "Aryan country." In 1936, the Reich Cabinet officially classified Iranians as "pure-blooded Aryans" by passing a special decree exempting them from any restrictions to the Nuremberg Laws. This meant that despite the diverse ideas of various Nazi racial theorists on Iran, the official state policy affirmed the racial affinity between Iranians and Germans, and thus Iranians were classed as Aryans ("of related blood" to Germans under the Nuremberg Laws).

==== Nazi racial policies ====
By the late 19th century, German and Austrian student fraternities (along with some professional associations) had already introduced 'Aryan clauses' excluding Jews. The Third Reich was the first to formalize the term Aryan in national legislation. On 7 April 1933, the Nazi government enacted the 'Aryan Paragraph' (Arierparagraph); expressions such as 'Proof of Aryan Ancestry' (Ariernachweis) and 'Aryanisation' (Arisierung) subsequently entered official legal language, used to implement racial laws primarily targeting Jews. In September 1935, the Nazis enacted the Nuremberg Laws, which required proof of 'Aryan descent' as a prerequisite for Reich citizenship. Applicants could demonstrate this by obtaining an Ahnenpass ('ancestor passport'), providing documentary proof—typically baptismal or parish records—that all four grandparents were of 'Aryan' descent. In December of the same year, the SS established Lebensborn ('Fount of Life') to increase births among racially 'valuable' Germans and to promote population policy based on Nazi eugenic principles.

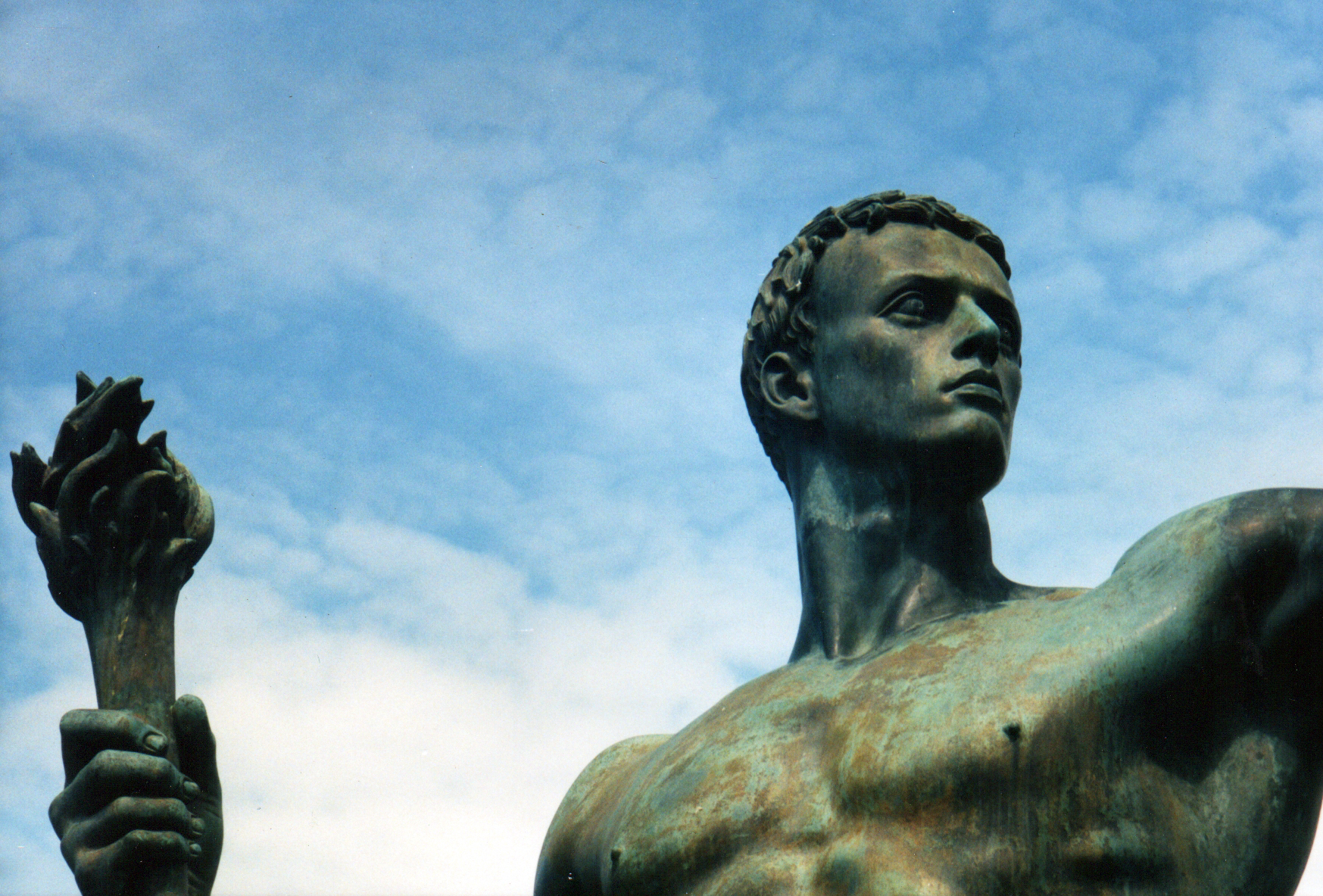
Arno Breker's sculpture Die Partei (The Party), depicting a Nazi-era ideal of the "Nordic Aryan" racial type

Many American white supremacist and neo-Nazi groups and prison gangs continue to refer to themselves as 'Aryans', including the Aryan Brotherhood, the Aryan Nations, the Aryan Republican Army, the White Aryan Resistance, or the Aryan Circle. In Russia, several nationalist and neo-Pagan movements claim direct descent from the ancient 'Aryans', while in some Indian nationalist circles, the term 'Aryan' is still used in reference to a supposed Aryan 'race'.

=== Aryanism in India ===
==== Racial interpretations of the Rigveda ====
In 1888, Max Müller, whose early effort to trace physical differences between Aryans and Dāsas in the Rigveda had inadvertently launched racial interpretations of Vedic texts, denounced talk of an "Aryan race, Aryan blood, Aryan eyes and hair" as a nonsense comparable to a linguist speaking of "a dolichocephalic dictionary or a brachycephalic grammar". Nevertheless, an increasing number of Western writers, particularly anthropologists and popularizers influenced by Darwinian theories, came to conceive the Āryas of the Rigveda as a 'physical-genetic species' distinct from other human groups – rather than as an ethnolinguistic category.

In the late 19th and early 20th centuries, noted anthropologists Theodor Poesche and Thomas Huxley quoted from the Rigveda to suggest that the Aryans were blond and tall, with blue eyes and dolichocephalic skulls. Throughout the 20th century, physical anthropologists continued to debate these racial interpretations — some associating Indo-European speakers with light physical traits, others rejecting any biological basis for such claims. According to archeologist Elena Kuzmina (1931–2013), both the Avesta and the Rig Veda support the view that the Aryans did possess light eyes, light skin, and light hair, whereas linguist Hans Henrich Hock has argued that most Vedic passages traditionally cited for this interpretation may refer instead to contrasts between dark and light worlds rather than to human pigmentation.

Most modern scholars state that the historical Aryans, the Vedic period Bronze Age tribes who composed the Rigveda and the Avesta, and who were the ancestors of contemporary Indo-Aryan and Iranian peoples, were highly unlikely to have been blond or blue-eyed, contrary to the proponents of Aryanism and Nordicism. They further assert that even in ancient times, the Aryan identity as asserted in the Rig Veda was cultural, religious, and linguistic, not racial; nor do the Vedas contemplate racial purity. The Rig Veda affirms a ritualistic barrier: an individual is considered Aryan if they sacrifice to the right gods, which requires performing traditional prayer in the traditional language, and does not connote a racial barrier. Michael Witzel states that term Aryan "does not mean a particular people or even a particular 'racial' group but all those who had joined the tribes speaking Vedic Sanskrit and adhering to their cultural norms (such as ritual, poetry, etc.)".

==== Nazi views on Indo-Aryans ====
From the mid-1930s onward, certain SS ideologues and Adolf Hitler himself increasingly expressed admiration for the ancient Indo-Aryan civilization of northern India and its supposed upper caste heirs. They interpreted the Vedic texts and the varna system as evidence that a light-skinned Aryan warrior elite had once imposed rigorous racial hierarchy on the subcontinent. By late 1944, as relations with the United Kingdom hardened into total enmity, Hitler privately described the Maurya Empire under Chandragupta Maurya and Bindusara (pointedly excluding the later Buddhist Ashoka) as the historical pinnacle of Aryan statecraft, a racially pure empire that had unified nearly the entire subcontinent through conquest and iron discipline. Senior Ahnenerbe researchers received orders to emphasise linguistic, mythic, and racial parallels between the ancient Indic and Germanic traditions. In the final year of the war, Hitler and elements within the SS leadership began to regard upper-caste North Indians of purportedly unmixed Indo-Aryan descent as distant racial cousins and as the natural bearers of a future Hindu Rashtra aligned with National Socialist principles. Late-war German propaganda celebrated Subhas Chandra Bose as the authentic voice of Aryan India, and a small number of Indian Legion volunteers were reclassified as "honorary Aryans" in internal SS documents of early 1945. These ideological shifts, which included tentative plans to support a post-war independent India free from British rule and modelled on Hindutva ideology, remained largely theoretical due to the rapid military collapse of the Third Reich.

==== British Raj ====
In India, the British colonial government had followed de Gobineau's arguments along another line, and had fostered the idea of a superior 'Aryan race' that co-opted the caste system in India in favor of imperial interests. In its fully developed form, the British-mediated interpretation foresaw a segregation of Aryan and non-Aryan along the lines of caste, with the upper castes being "Aryan" and the lower ones being 'non-Aryan'. The European developments not only allowed the British to identify themselves as high-caste, but also allowed the Brahmins to view themselves as on-par with the British. Further, it provoked the reinterpretation of Indian history in racialist and, in opposition, Indian nationalist terms.

==== "Aryan invasion theory" ====
Translating the sacred Indian texts of the Rig Veda in the 1840s, German linguist Friedrich Max Muller found what he believed was evidence of an ancient invasion of India by Hindu Brahmins, a group which he called "the Arya." In his later works, Muller was careful to note that he thought that Aryan was a linguistic rather than a racial category. Nevertheless, scholars used Muller's invasion theory to propose their own visions of racial conquest through South Asia and the Indian Ocean. In 1885, the New Zealand polymath Edward Tregear argued that an "Aryan tidal-wave" had washed over India and continued to push south, through the islands of the East Indian archipelago, reaching the distant shores of New Zealand. Scholars such as John Batchelor, Armand de Quatrefages, and Daniel Brinton extended this invasion theory to the Philippines, Hawaii, and Japan, identifying indigenous peoples who they believed were the descendants of early Aryan conquerors. With the discovery of the Indus Valley civilization, mid-20th century archeologist Mortimer Wheeler argued that the large urban civilization had been destroyed by the Aryans. Later, this position was discredited, with climate aridification being viewed as the likely cause of the collapse of the Indus Valley Civilization. The term "invasion", while it was once commonly used in regard to Indo-Aryan migration, is now usually used only by opponents of the Indo-Aryan migration theory. The term "invasion" does not any longer reflect the scholarly understanding of the Indo-Aryan migrations, and is now generally regarded as polemical, distracting and unscholarly.

In recent decades, the idea of an Aryan migration into India has mainly been disputed by Indian scholars, who have various alternate theories about the early history of the Indigenous Aryans which are contrary to the established Kurgan model. However, these alternative theories are rooted in traditional and religious views of Indian history and identity and are universally rejected by mainstream scholars. (Note: No support in mainstream scholarship: Romila Thapar (2006): "there is no scholar at this time seriously arguing for the indigenous origin of Aryans".; Wendy Doniger (2017): "The opposing argument, that speakers of Indo-European languages were indigenous to the Indian subcontinent, is not supported by any reliable scholarship. It is now championed primarily by Hindu nationalists, whose religious sentiments have led them to regard the theory of Aryan migration with some asperity." (Note: Wendy Doniger (2017), "Another Great Story"", review of Asko Parpola's The Roots of Hinduism; in: Inference, International Review of Science, Volume 3, Issue 2); Girish Shahane (September 14, 2019), in response to Narasimhan et al. (2019): "Hindutva activists, however, have kept the Aryan Invasion Theory alive, because it offers them the perfect strawman, 'an intentionally misrepresented proposition that is set up because it is easier to defeat than an opponent's real argument' ... The Out of India hypothesis is a desperate attempt to reconcile linguistic, archaeological and genetic evidence with Hindutva sentiment and nationalistic pride, but it cannot reverse time's arrow ... The evidence keeps crushing Hindutva ideas of history." (Note: Girish Shahane (September 14, 2019), Why Hindutva supporters love to hate the discredited Aryan Invasion Theory, Scroll.in); Koenraad Elst (May 10, 2016): "Of course it is a fringe theory, at least internationally, where the Aryan Invasion Theory (AIT) is still the official paradigm. In India, though, it has the support of most archaeologists, who fail to find a trace of this Aryan influx and instead find cultural continuity.") According to Michael Witzel, the "indigenous Aryans" position is not scholarship in the usual sense, but an "apologetic, ultimately religious undertaking". A number of other alternative theories have been proposed, including the Anatolian hypothesis, the Armenian hypothesis, and the Paleolithic continuity theory, but these are not widely accepted and have received little or no interest in mainstream scholarship.

== See also ==
- Aria, a province of the Achaemenid, Seleucid, and Parthian Empires
- Arya Samaj, considered a monotheistic Indian Hindu reform movement, its name means the "Noble", i.e., the "Aryan Society"
- Graeco-Aryan
- Šahrestānīhā ī Ērānšahr § Terms Eran and Eranshahr – Eranshahr, the official name of the Sasanian Empire, literally means the "Land/Empire of the Aryans"
- Yamnaya culture

== Notes ==
Web
