= Ludwig Wilser =

Ludwig Wilser (1850–1923) was a German anthropologist and racialist researcher. Alongside Otto Ammon and Ludwig Woltmann, he was a leading representative of the "Anthroposoziologie" (anthropological sociology), a form of scientific racism.

== Theories and political views ==
Wilser was a pupil of Alexander Ecker, adopting the latter's theory of dolichocephaly (longer head forms) typically occurring alongside blue eyes and blonde hair among Germanic peoples. Based on Ecker's work, Wilser created an entire narrative which alleged that the Germanic race had evolved into the most superior form of Homo sapiens in Scandinavia during the Ice Age, originating higher culture and spreading it across Europe during migrations. Alongside Lazarus Geiger, Theodor Poesche, Karl Penka, and Gustaf Kossinna, Wilser also supported the North European hypothesis and contributed to the emerging tendency to use the word Aryan as a synonym for Nordic or Germanic. He was a close associate of Otto Ammon and Ludwig Woltmann who supported a similar form of scientific racism and were later grouped together as representatives of the Anthroposoziologie (anthropological sociology).

After the discovery of the Mauer 1 mandible in 1907, Wilser proposed to assign the specimen to a new genus dubbed "Rhenanthropus heidelbergensis" in recognition of its age and primitiveness. Mauer 1 was later assigned to Homo heidelbergensis.

According to sociologist Stefan Breuer, Wilser was part of the broader far-right movement in the German Empire, and can be considered part of the radical right's "old nationalism" (German: Alte Nationalismus) current. In this regard, Wilser was racist as he believed that the Germanic race was superior among humankind, but he did not advocate race purity politics or racial hygiene due to regarding intermixing of various races as both inevitable and irreversible. Instead, Wilser and other "old nationalism" adherents assumed that their racist theories supported the continued rule of the existing upper class, as it allegedly contained a higher level of racialist superior elements than the lower classes. They also thought that the alleged superiority of the Germamic race meant that the German Empire should rightfully be one of the world powers. Wilser was politically aligned with the Pan-German League (German: Alldeutscher Verband) which also adhered to mostly "old nationalist" beliefs.
