= Aryan race =

Pseudoscientific racial grouping

The Aryan race is a pseudoscientific historical race concept that emerged in the late-19th century to describe people who descend from the Proto-Indo-Europeans as a racial grouping. The terminology derives from the historical usage of Aryan, used by Indo-Iranians as an ethnocultural self-designative identity and epithet of "noble". Anthropological, historical, and archaeological evidence does not support the validity of the racial concept.

The concept derives from the notion that the original speakers of the Proto-Indo-European language were distinct progenitors of a superior specimen of humankind, and that their descendants up to the present day constitute either a distinctive race or a sub-race of the Caucasian race, alongside the Semitic race and the Hamitic race. This taxonomic approach to categorizing human population groups is now considered to be misguided and biologically meaningless due to the close genetic similarity and complex interrelationships between these groups.

The term was adopted by various racist and antisemitic writers during the 19th century, including Arthur de Gobineau, Richard Wagner, and Houston Stewart Chamberlain, whose scientific racism influenced later Nazi racial ideology. By the 1930s, the concept had been associated with both Nazism and Nordicism, and used to support the white supremacist ideology of Aryanism that portrayed the Aryan race as a "master race", with non-Aryans regarded as racially inferior (Untermensch, lit. 'subhuman') and an existential threat that was to be exterminated. In Nazi Germany, these ideas formed an essential part of the state ideology that led to the Holocaust.

== History ==
=== Debates on linguistic homeland ===
In the late 18th century, Proto-Indo-European (PIE) was constructed as the hypothesized common proto-language of the Indo-European languages. Sir William Jones, who was acclaimed as the "most respected linguist in Europe" for his Grammar of the Persian Language (1771), was appointed one of the three justices of the Supreme Court of Bengal. Jones, who arrived in Calcutta and began his study of Sanskrit and the Rig Veda, was astonished by the lexical similarities between Sanskrit and other Indo-European languages such as Persian, Gothic, Greek, and Latin, and concluded that Sanskrit—as a descendant language—belonged to the same proto- or parent-language in the language family—that is PIE, as the other Indo-European languages, in his Third Anniversary Discourse on the Hindus (1786). However, the linguistic homeland of the original speakers of Proto-Indo-European was a politicized debate among the archaeologists and comparative historical linguists since the start, entangling in chauvinistic causes. Some European nationalists and dictators, most notably the Nazis, later attempted to identify their country or region as the Proto-Indo-European homeland and their people as belonging to a pure and superior race.

According to Leon Poliakov, the concept of the Aryan race was deeply rooted in philology, based on the work of Sir William Jones' claiming that Sanskrit was related to Greco-Roman (European) languages. Other thinkers invented secularized origins for European civilization that were not based on the biblical genealogies from which Europe's aristocracy had long claimed descent.

=== Romanticism and Social Darwinism ===
The influence of Romanticism in Germany saw a revival of the intellectual quest for "the German language and traditions" and a desire to "discard the cold, artificial logic of Enlightenment". After Darwin's 1859 publication of On the Origin of Species and publicization of the theorized model of Proto-Indo-European language (PIE), the Romantics convicted that language was a defining factor in national identity, combined with the new ideas of Darwinism. The German nationalists misemployed the scientific theory of natural selection for the rationalization of the supposed fitness of some races over others, although Darwin himself never applied his theory of fitness to vague entities such as races or languages. The "unfit" races were suggested as a source of genetic weakness, and a threat that might contaminate the superior qualities of the "fit" races. The misleading mixture of pseudoscience and Romanticism produced new racial ideologies which used distorted Social Darwinist interpretations of race to explain "the superior biological-spiritual-linguistic essence of the Northern Europeans" in self-congratulatory studies. Subsequently, the German Romantics' quest for a "pure" national heritage led to the interpretation of the ancient speakers of PIE language as the distinct progenitors of a "racial-linguistic-national stereotype".

== Invention ==
=== Racial association of the term Aryan ===
The term "Aryan" was originally used as an ethnocultural self-designative identity and epithet of "noble" by Indo-Iranians and the authors of the oldest known religious texts of Rig Veda and Avesta within the Indo-Iranian branch of Indo-European language family—Sanskrit and Iranian, who lived in ancient India and Iran. Although the Sanskrit ā́rya- and Iranian *arya- descended from a form *ā̆rya-, it was only attested to the Indo-Iranian tribes. Benjamin W. Fortson states that there may have been no term for self-designation of Proto-Indo-Europeans, and no such morpheme has survived. J. P. Mallory et al. states although the term "Aryan" takes on an ethnic meaning attesting to Indo-Iranians, there is no grounds for ascribing this semantic use to the Proto-Indo-European reconstruction of lexicon *h₂eryós i.e. there is no evidence that the speakers of proto-language referred to themselves as "Aryans". However, in the 19th century, it was proposed that ā́rya- was not only the tribal self-designation of Indo-Iranians, but self-designation of Proto-Indo-Europeans themselves, a theory rejected by modern scholarship. "Aryan" then came to be used by scholars of the 19th century to refer to Indo-Europeans. The now-discredited and chronologically reconstructed North European hypothesis was endorsed by such scholars who situated the PIE homeland in northern Europe, which led to the association of "Proto-Indo-Europeans", originally a hypothesized linguistic population of Eurasian PIE speakers, with a new, imagined biological category: "a tall, light-complexioned, blonde, blue-eyed race" — supposed phenotypic traits of the Nordic race. The anglicized term "Aryan" then developed a purely racialist meaning pertaining solely to this purported Nordic racial type. Regarding Nazi Germany specifically, the Nazis considered a variety of different populations to be generally Aryan, but they regarded the Nordic racial type as the "purest" and "ideal" type of Aryan, causing them to place Nordic-Germanics at the top of their racial hierarchy. In modern ethnolinguistic scholarship, “Aryan" and "Indo-Aryan" are used only in their original senses, referring to the Indo-Iranian and Indic branches of Indo-European, respectively.

Classification of human races based on the now-pseudoscientific study of phenotypical differences developed during the nineteenth century and evidence in support of such theories were sought from the study of language and reconstructions of language families. Scholars of this era established the ethnological term "Aryan" as the race that had spoken the Proto-Indo-European language, and in this context, the term was often used as a synonym for "Indo-Europeans".

There is considerable disagreement as to whether or not the Indo-Iranians actually belonged to a distinct physical type. According to Elena Kuzmina, the Aryans in the Avesta were tall, light-skinned and frequently light-haired or light-eyed. She states that, in the Rig Veda, light skin was the primary physical differentiator between the Aryans and the indigenous population of India, who were darker. Skin color was also the basis of social division among the Vedic Aryans; the varnas of priests and warriors condemned the 'black skinned' aboriginal Dasa.

However, other scholars have opined that Aryan identity as asserted in the Rig Veda was cultural, religious, and linguistic, not racial; and that the Vedas do not contemplate racial purity. Michael Witzel states that term Aryan "does not mean a particular people or even a particular 'racial' group but all those who had joined the tribes speaking Vedic Sanskrit and adhering to their cultural norms, indicating diversity among them. David Anthony said it is "highly doubtful" that the Aryans of south Asia were blond and blue-eyed.

=== North Europe hypothesis and archaeological affirmation ===
The racial interpretation of Aryans stems from the now-discredited culture-historical archaeology theory of Gustaf Kossinna, who asserted a one-to-one correspondence between archaeological culture and archaeological race. According to Kossinna, the continuity of a "culture" exposits the continuity of a "race" which lived continuously in the same area, and the resemblance of a culture in a younger layer to a culture from an older layer indicates that the autochthonous tribe from the homeland had migrated. Kossinna developed an ethnic paradigm in archaeology called settlement archaeology and practiced the nationalistic interpretation of German archaeology for the Third Reich. The obsolete North European hypothesis was endorsed by Kossinna and Karl Penka, including German nationalists, which was later used by the Nazis to condone their genocidal and racist state policies. Kossinna identified the Proto-Indo-Europeans with the Corded Ware culture, and placed the Proto-Indo-European homeland in Schleswig-Holstein. He argued a diffusionist model of culture, and emphasised the racial superiority of Germanic peoples over Romans (Roman Empire) and French, whom he described as destroyers of culture as compared to Germanics. Kossinna's work has been heavily criticised for ambiguities in his methodology and his advocacy for the ideology of a Germanic master race.

=== Earliest utilization of Aryan race ===
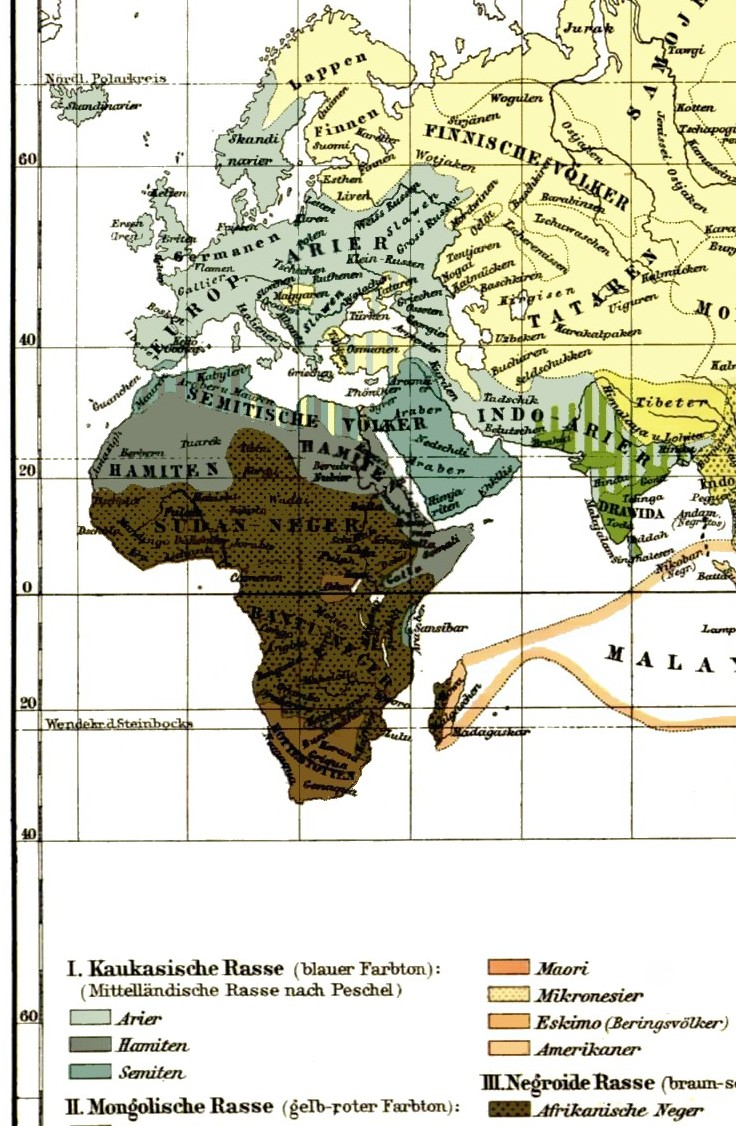
A nineteenth-century edition of the Meyers Konversations-Lexikon shows the Caucasian race (in shades of grayish blue) as comprising Aryans, Semites, and Hamites. Aryans are subdivided into European Aryans and Indo-Aryans (for those now called Indo-Iranians) and shown on the map in grayish light-blue color (described as Arier in the legend). The map shows most Europeans, Caucasians, and Iranian peoples as comprising Aryans, while Indo-Aryans are shown as being a mixture between Aryans and Dravidians.

Max Müller popularized the term Aryan in his writings on comparative linguistics, and is often identified as the first writer to mention an Aryan race in English. He began the racial interpretation of the Vedic passages based upon his editing of the Rigveda from 1849 to 1874. He postulated a small Aryan clan living on a high elevation in central Asia, speaking a proto-language ancestral to later Indo-European languages, which later branched off in two directions: one moved towards Europe and the other migrated to Iran, eventually splitting again with one group invading north-western India and conquering the dark-skinned dasas of Scythian origin who lived there. The northern Aryans of Europe became energetic and combative, and they invented the idea of a nation, while the southern Aryans of Iran and India were passive and meditative and focussed on religion and philosophy.

Though he occasionally used the term "Aryan race" afterward, Müller later objected to the mixing of the linguistic and racial categories, and was "deeply saddened by the fact that these classifications later came to be expressed in racist terms". In his 1888 lecture at Oxford, he stated, "[the] science of Language and the science of Man cannot be kept too much asunder [...] it would be as wrong to speak of Aryan blood as of dolichocephalic grammar", and in his Biographies of Words and the Home of the Aryas (1888), he writes, "[the] ethnologist who speaks of Aryan race, Aryan blood, Aryan eyes, and hair, is a great sinner as a linguist [...]".

European scholars of 19th century interpreted the Vedic passages as depicting battle between light-skinned Aryan migrants and dark-skinned indigenous tribes, but modern scholars reject this characterization of racial division as a misreading of the Sanskrit text, and indicate that the Rig Vedic opposition between ārya and dasyu is distinction between "disorder, chaos and dark side of human nature" contrasted with the concepts of "order, purity, goodness and light", and "dark and light worlds". In other contexts of the Vedic passages the dinstiction between ārya and dasyu refers to those who had adopted the Vedic religion, speaking Vedic Sanskrit, and those who opposed it.

However, increasing number of Western writers of this era, especially among anthropologists and non-specialists influenced by Darwinist theories, contrasted Aryans as a "physical-genetic species" rather than an ethnolinguistic category.

Encyclopedias and textbooks of historiography, ethnography, and anthropology from this era, such as Meyers Konversations-Lexikon, Brockhaus Enzyklopädie, Nordisk familjebok, H. G. Wells's A Short History of the World, John Clark Ridpath's Great Races of Mankind, and other works reinforced European racial constructions developed on now-pseudoscientific concepts such as racial taxonomy, Social Darwinism, and scientific racism to classify human races.

=== Theories of racial supremacy ===
The term Aryan was adopted by various racist and antisemitic writers such as Arthur de Gobineau, Theodor Poesche, Houston Chamberlain, Paul Broca, Karl Penka and Hans Günther during the nineteenth century for the promotion of scientific racism, spawning ideologies such as Nordicism and Aryanism. The connotation of the term Aryan was detached from its proper geographic and linguistic confinement as a Indo-Iranian branch of Indo-European language family by this time. The inequality of races and the notion of a "superior race" was universally accepted by the scholars of this era, therefore race was referred to "national character and national culture" beyond biological confinement.

In 1853, Arthur de Gobineau published An Essay on the Inequality of the Human Races, in which he originally identified the Aryan race as the white race, and the only civilized one, and conceived cultural decline and miscegenation as intimately intertwined. He argued that the Aryans represented a superior branch of humanity, and attempted to identify the races of Europe as Aryan and associated them with the sons of Noah, emphasizing superiority, and categorized non-Aryan as an intrusion of the Semitic race. According to him, northern Europeans had migrated across the world and founded the major civilizations, before being diluted through racial mixing with indigenous populations described as racially inferior, leading to the progressive decay of the ancient Aryan civilizations.

In 1878, German American anthropologist Theodor Poesche published a survey of historical references attempting to demonstrate that the Aryans were light-skinned blue-eyed blonds.

In 1899, Houston Stewart Chamberlain published what is described as "one of the most important proto-Nazi texts", The Foundations of the Nineteenth Century, in which he theorized an existential struggle to the death between a superior German-Aryan race and a destructive Jewish-Semitic race.

In 1916, Madison Grant published The Passing of the Great Race, a polemic against interbreeding between "Aryan" Americans, the original Thirteen Colonies settlers of British-Irish-German origin, with immigrant "inferior races", which according to him were, Poles, Czechs, Jews, and Italians. The book was a best-seller at the time.

While the Aryan race theory remained popular, particularly in Germany, some authors opposed it, in particular Otto Schrader, Rudolph von Jhering and the ethnologist Robert Hartmann, who proposed to ban the notion of Aryan from anthropology. The term was also adopted by various occultists and esoteric ideological systems of this era, such as Helena Blavatsky, and Ariosophy.

== Nazism ==
=== Subhuman and inferior races in Nazi Germany ===
The racial policies of Nazi Germany, the 1935 Nuremberg Laws, and the racist doctrines of Adolf Hitler considered Jews, Roma and Slavs, including Poles, Czechs, Russians and Serbs, "racially inferior sub-humans" (German: Untermensch, lit. 'sub-human'); the term was also applied to "Mischling" (persons of mixed "Aryan" and non-Aryan, such as Jewish, ancestry) and black people.

=== Connotation of the term Aryan in Nazi racial theories ===
A definition of Aryan that included all non-Jewish Europeans was deemed unacceptable, and the Expert Committee on Questions of Population and Racial Policy of 1933 brought together important Nazi intellectuals Alfred Ploetz, Fritz Thyssen, and Ernst Rüdin to plan the course of Nazi racial policy, defining an Aryan as one who was "tribally related to the German blood and descendant of a Volk". The term "Volksdeutsche" was used by Nazis to indicate "ethnic Germans" who did not hold German Reich citizenship; Volksdeutsche further consist of "racial groups"—minorities within a state—who are descendants of a Volk domiciled in Europe in a closed tribal settlement and are closely related to German racial community. The Nazi concept of "Volksgemeinschaft" racially unified ethnic Germans, including those living outside the German Reich, propounding only the members of the racial community be considered Aryan.

Members of the SS deemed Aryans not to be of a single ethnic group, and did not have to be exclusively German, but could be selected from populations across Europe to create "master race". Nazi Party established the organization NSDAP/AO to disseminate Nazi propaganda among the ethnic German minorities considered Volksdeutsche in central and eastern Europe. Nazi racial theories considered the "purest stock of Aryans" the Nordic people, identified by physical anthropological features such as tallness, white skin, blue eyes, narrow and straight noses, dolichocephalic skulls, prominent chins, and blond hair, including Scandinavians, Germans, English and French, with Nordic and Germanic people being the "master race" (German: Herrenrasse). Recent archaeogenetic studies contradict these ideas, and instead suggest that Proto-Indo-European speaking peoples probably had brown eyes and hair, and intermediate skin complexion.

=== Historical revisionism ===
After the death of Kossinna, Heinrich Himmler, and other Nazi figures such as Alfred Rosenberg, adopted his nationalistic theories of Germanic peoples and methodologies, including settlement archaeology, and founded the SS organization Ahnenerbe (German: Deutsches Ahnenerbe) for conducting archaeological investigations of a presumed "Germanic expansion in pre-history". Nazi scholars endorsed the now-discredited North European hypothesis in an effort to prove PIE was originally spoken by an "Aryan master race", and associated the Semitic languages with "inferior races". Historical revisionism around race was disseminated through the Nazi think tank Ahnenerbe. Hitler regularly invoked Social Darwinist concepts of Ernst Haeckel such as higher evolution (German: Höherentwicklung), struggle for existence (German: Existenzkampf), selection (German: Auslese), struggle for life (German: Lebenskampf), in his Nazi racial ideology, which is the central theme in the chapter "Nation and Race" of Mein Kampf. Haeckel's Social Darwinism was also praised by Alfred Ploetz, founder of the German Society for Racial Hygiene, who made him an honorary member of the eugenic organization.

=== Nazi eugenics and Nordic supremacy ===
In 1938, the Reich Ministry of Education released the German biology curriculum which reflected the curriculum developed by the National Socialist Teachers League and emphasized the Social Darwinst interpretation of the evolution of human races. Hans Weinert, who had joined the SS and worked for the Kaiser Wilhelm Institute of Anthropology publishing theories of Nazi eugenics and racial evolution, claimed the Nordic race as a highly evolved race, and Aboriginal Australians as being the lowest rank in the racial hierarchy. Hans F. K. Günther was considered to be the most influential Nazi anthropologist, although he was not professionally trained. Günther's racist writings on Nordicism was suffused with the ideas of Gobineau, who believed the Nordic race had originated in northern Europe and spread through conquest; this had expressed approval of the Nazi eugenics policies and had critical influence on scientific racism. Günther's theories gained acclamation from Hitler, who later included his books as a recommended reading material for the Nazi Party members. After the Nazis came to power, selective breeding for supposed Aryan traits such as athleticism, blond hair and blue eyes was encouraged, while the "inferior races" and people with physical or mental illness were deemed "life unworthy of life" (German: lebensunwertes Leben, lit. 'lives unworthy of life') and many were interned in concentration camps.

=== Ethnic cleansing and the Holocaust ===
The culmination of Nazi eugenicist and racial hygiene programs of sterilization and extermination aimed at creating an "Aryan master race" and eliminating "inferior non-Aryan types" such as Jews, Slavs, Poles, Roma, homosexuals, and the disabled. Nazi Germany introduced the Anti-Jewish legislation that systemically discriminated against Jews by requiring Aryan certification for a German Reich citizen. After Hitler became the Chancellor of Germany, the public policies of Nazi Germany became increasingly hostile towards supposed "inferior types", particularly Jews, who were considered to be the highest manifestation of the Semitic race, and segregation of Jews in ghettos culminated in the policy of extermination the Nazis called the Final Solution to the Jewish Question. The state-sponsored persecution systematically murdered over 6 million Jews, 5.7 million Slavs, 1.8–3 million Poles, 270,000 disabled people, among other victims, including children through mass shooting, gas chamber, gas van, and concentration camps, in the process known as the Holocaust. The ethnic Germans considered Volksdeutsche joined the local SS organizations under NSDAP/AO and participated in Nazi-sponsored pogroms in eastern and central Europe during the Holocaust, including seizures of Jewish property. The Aryan race belief was used by the Nazis to justify the persecution, depicting the victims as the "antipode and eternal enemy of the Aryans".

== White supremacy ==
Following Nazi Germany's defeat in World War II, various neo-Nazi and racial nationalist movements developed a more inclusive definition of Aryan claiming to Western European peoples, with Nordic and Germanic peoples being the most "racially pure".

In the United States, most white nationalists define whiteness broadly as people of European ancestry, and some consider Jews to be white although this is controversial within white nationalist circles. Many white supremacist neo-Nazi groups and prison gangs, in the United States and elsewhere, view themselves as part of an Aryan race, including the Aryan Brotherhood, Aryan Nations, Aryan Guard, Aryan Republican Army, White Aryan Resistance, Aryan Circle, Aryan Brotherhood of Texas, and others.

== Neo-pagan movements ==
Indo-European history, real and feigned, plays a significant role in various neo-pagan movements.

=== Russian neo-paganism ===
"Kolovrat", the most common symbol of Slavic Neopaganism. According to its practitioners, it is an ancient Slavic symbol; however, the historic usage of such iconography is not attested in authentic sources.

The Russian Slavophile movements borrowed various discrete ideas of a presumed "prestigious Aryan origin" of Europeans from Nazi Germany. Although Russian Orthodoxy was the primary religious influence on Russian nationalists, the primacy of Christianity was treated skeptically by these groups, who later began searching for an ancient text to rationalize a "return to the origins". Various writers in the newspaper Zhar-Ptitsa showed interest in a purported manuscript—the Book of Veles—which supposedly dated to the first century BCE. F. A. Izenbek, a White Army officer, alleged the discovery of this manuscript during the Russian Civil War. However one of Izenbek's friends, Iurii Miroliubov, had forged the manuscript, and used the term "Vedism" to describe Russian neo-paganism; he later appropriated the Indian religious scripture, the Vedas, to aggrandize the manuscript. Nationalistic white Russian émigrés and neo-Pagans consider the manuscript to be an authentic historical source of Slavic antiquity, who claim a direct link between "ancient Aryans" and themselves as Slavs. However, the manuscript is declared literary forgery by scholars. Alexey Dobrovolsky, a Russian neo-Nazi, is considered the founding Nazi ideologue of Slavic Neopaganism.

=== Goddess movement ===
With the rise of first-wave feminism, various authors of the Goddess movement cast the ancient Indo-Europeans as a "patriarchal, warlike invaders who destroyed a utopian prehistoric world of feminine peace and beauty" in various archaeological dramas and books such as Riane Eisler's The Chalice and the Blade (1987) and Marija Gimbutas's Civilization of the Goddess (1991).

== See also ==
- Nazi human experimentation
- Esoteric Nazism
- Renordification
- Positive Christianity
- List of victims of Nazism
