= Otto Schrader =

Otto Schrader may refer to:

- Otto Schrader (philologist) (1855–1919), German philologist and Indo-European scholar
- Otto von Schrader (1888–1945), German naval officer
