= Salmon problem =

Argument on the Proto-Indo-European urheimat

In Indo-European studies, the salmon problem or salmon argument (also known by the German term Lachsargument) is an outdated argument in favour of placing the Indo-European linguistic homeland in the Baltic region, as opposed to the Eurasian Steppe, based on the cognate etymology of the respective words for salmon in Germanic and Balto-Slavic languages. The word's wide distribution means it likely existed in its current form in a Proto-Indo-European language.

The reasoning went as follows: since the term for Atlantic salmon in the Germanic, Baltic and Slavic languages could be derived from a common Proto-Indo-European root *laḱs-, the Indo-European homeland must be where both the languages and the object it describes can be found: Northern-Central Europe. The argument was first put forward by German philologist Otto Schrader in 1883. The argument was subject to continued scholarly debate throughout the late 19th and early 20th centuries, particularly in German academia.

In 1953, German indologist Paul Thieme proposed that the descendants of *laḱs- found in the Caucasus described the brown trout (Salmo trutta) rather than the Atlantic salmon (Salmo salar). American philologist George Sherman Lane concurred in a 1970 conference paper: "In my opinion, the name in question probably did refer originally not to the Salmo salar at all, but rather to the Salmo trutta caspius of the northwest Caucasus region." This supported the Steppe theory instead.

== Origin ==
=== "Salmon" in early Indo-European linguistics ===
From the mid-19th century onwards, philologists began to be interested in words, which were similar in multiple Indo-European languages. They were considered to share a common origin either in Proto-Indo-European or in the younger proto language of the so-called "Litu-Slavo-Geramans". The occurrence or absence of those words was thought to provide clues for the Indo-European homeland. Some of the numerous hypotheses about its location, for instance, in Northern Europe, in the Kurgan, or in the Balkans, were based on race theory or nationalistic ideas.

Comparative linguistics indicated a lack of common Indo-European vocabulary for fishes. Even a shared word for "fish" itself seemed to be absent (comp. Latin: piscis, Sanskrit: mátsya-, Ancient Greek: ichthýs, and Church Slavonic: ryba). This made an origin from Eurasian Steppe or woods, which have few fish, seem plausible.

When it came to salmon (Latin: Salmo salar), however, dictionaries published from the 1870s onwards began to compile more and more similar words for it in Germanic, Baltic, and Slavic languages. Those forms excluded the possibility of it being a loanword. In 1876, the German philologist August Fick collected Old Norse: lax, Old High German: lahs, German: Lachs, Lithuanian: lászis, lasziszas, Latvian: lassis, lassens, Prussian: lasasso, Polish: łosoś, and Russian: losósʹ. The Deutsches Wörterbuch by the Brothers Grimm added Old English: leax in 1877. The philologist Friedrich Kluge further added Scottish Gaelic: lax and reconstructed Gothic: *lahs.

=== Earliest articulation of the argument ===
Otto Schrader was the first to locate the "land of the Slavo-Germans" based on a zoogeographical argument. He argued that the terms for salmon indicated an area where salmon can be found. According to Brehms Tierleben, salmon populate the Baltic Sea, the North Sea and the eastern Arctic Ocean in Europe. Since Schrader thought this to be the origin of the Germanic people only, he did not introduce this argument in the discussion about the Indo-European homeland.

The anthropologist Karl Penka, who believed the homeland to be in South Scandinavia, wrote about salmon in 1886, "this fish was known to Arian people," without stating how he came to this conclusion. He expanded the salmon argument by further exploring a lack of words for salmon: "Salmons (Salmo salar), which has its habitat in the Arctic Ocean and the northern part of the Atlantic, can only be found in the rivers of Russia flowing into Baltic Sea and the White Sea, but not in those that flow into the Black Sea, or the Caspian Sea. Neither does it occur in the rivers of Asia and the Mediterranean, therewith explaining the absence of corresponding forms of Proto-Indo-European *lakhasa in the Iranian and Indic languages, Greek, and Latin." Penka does not explain the origin of his reconstructed form *lakhasa.

Schrader responded in 1890: "[The words for salmon similar to Lachs] are confined to a more limited linguistic area". The linguist Johannes Schmidt, too, used the absence of words for salmon from some Indo-European languages against Penka. He argued that Penka only postulates North European terms as Indo-European to show the equivalence of Indo-European animal terms and South Swedish fauna. In 1901 Schrader took over the formulation by Penka ex negativo: "Since the fish occur in those rivers only, which flow in to the Ocean or the Baltic Sea [...], it becomes clear why Greeks and Romans had peculiar names for this fish."

=== The early debate ===
In the first 30 years after its inception, both the advocates for a Northern European homeland and those locating the homeland in the steppe used the salmon argument. While the former interpreted the common origin of those words as Proto-Indo-European, the latter argued for it to stem from a phase when what was to become Germanic, Baltic and Slavic languages had already separated from the other languages. A linguistic debate about the Proto-Indo-European or the Proto-West-Germanic form of salmon did not take place. The homeland debate was based on the words for plants and mammals, agricultural terms, archeological findings, and craniological comparisons. The salmon argument was not at the forefront of this debate.

== Further debate ==
=== Tocharian B "laks" ===
In 1908, philologists identified an extinct language in Central Asia, in what is today known as the Tarim Basin in North-West China, as Indo-European and published the first translations of texts in the language. The textual fragments of the language were mostly from the second half of the first millennium AD and were written in two different variations, which were later called Tocharian A and B. The first to point out that it contained a word referring to salmon, even before the text including this word was published, was Schrader in 1911. At the time, he did not want to draw conclusions from it.

=== Ossetian "læsæg" ===
The next salmon word to be discovered was Iron Ossetic: læsæg in the Digorian dialect of Ossetian, which belongs to the Iranian branch of Indo-European and is spoken in the Northern part of the Caucasus. It was first recorded by a linguist in 1929. In 1934, the Norwegian Indoiranianst Georg Morgenstierne reasoned that "[it] can scarcely be a loan-word from Russian: losósʹ." He pointed out that salmon species do occur in Caucasian rivers; Indologist Sten Konow noted its similarity to the Tocharian word.

=== Armenian "losdi", Romance "*locca" ===
Following the discovery of words referring to salmon in Tocharian and Ossetian, further additions to the list of words for salmon did not reignite the debate. Armenian լոսդի, losdi, was first included in a dictionary in 1929 and added to the list in 1963. In 1976 the anthropologist Richard Diebold included Romance *locca in his list, which was proposed in 1935. By doing this he also added French: loche and its English descendant loach.

=== Further debate ===
Since 1911, the words for salmon were considered to be of Indo-European origin. After the fall of the Nazi regime in Germany, the salmon argument remained controversial for its identification of the homeland. The North European hypothesis was supported by the words for salmon in Tocharian and Ossetian, since it shows the common origin as an Indo-European root, but it also challenged the hypothesis, as the explanation for the geographic dispersion of the words became more and more problematic. What the speakers of Proto-Indo-European referred to as "salmon" was unclear until 1970.

== See also ==
- Historical linguistics
- Comparative method (linguistics)
- Proto-Indo-European homeland
- North European hypothesis
- Beech argument

== Bibliography ==
- Adams, Douglas Q. (1985). "PIE *lokso-, (anadromous) brown trout' and *kokso- 'groin' and their descendants in Tocharian: A coda to the Lachsargument". Indogermanische Forschungen (90). Berlin: Walter de Gruyter: 72–78.
- Diebold, A. Richard (1976). "Contributions to the Indo-European salmon problem". In Christie, William M (ed.). Current proceedings in historical linguistics. 2nd International Conference on Historical Linguistics, Tucson, 12–16 January 1976. Amsterdam: North-Holland. pp. 341–387.
- Giacalone Ramat, Anna; Ramat, Paolo (1998). The Indo-European Languages. New York: Routledge. ISBN 978-0-415-06449-1.
- Kluge, Friedrich (1883). Etymologisches Wörterbuch der deutschen Sprache [Etymological Dictionary of the German Language] (in German) (1st ed.). Straßburg: Karl J. Trübner.
- Kretschmer, Paul (1896). Einleitung in die Geschichte der griechischen Sprache [Introduction to the History of the Greek Language] (in German) (1st ed.). Göttingen: Vandenhoeck & Ruprecht.
- Krogmann, Willy (1960). "Das Lachsargument". Zeitschrift für vergleichende Sprachforschung (76).
- Lane, George Sherman (1970). "Tocharian. Indo-European and Non-Indo-European Relationships.". In Cardona, George; Hoenigswald, Henry M.; Senn, Alfred (eds.). Indo-European and Indo-Europeans. Third Indo-European Conference at the University of Pennsylvania. Philadelphia. p. 83.
- Meyer-Lübke, Wilhelm (1935). Romanisches etymologisches Wörterbuch [Etymological Dictionary of the Romance Language] (in German) (3rd ed.). Heidelberg: Winter.
- Miller, Gary D. (2007). "Indo-European and the Indo-Europeans" (PDF). University of Florida. Archived from the original (PDF) on 14 February 2019.
- Schmidt, Johannes (1890). "Die Urheimat der Indogermanen und das europäische Zahlsystem". In Deutsche Akademie der Wissenschaften zu Berlin (ed.). Abhandlungen der kgl. preussischen Akademie der Wissenschaften zu Berlin, phil.-hist. Klasse (in German). Berlin: Realschul-Buchhandlung.
- Schrader, Otto (1901). Reallexikon der indogermanischen Altertumskunde. Grundzüge einer Kultur- und Völkergeschichte Alteuropas (1 ed.). Straßburg: Karl J. Trübner Verlag.
- Schrader, Otto (1911). Die Indogermanen (in German). Leipzig.
- Schrader, Otto (1883). Sprachvergleichung und Urgeschichte. Linguistisch-historische Beiträge zur Erforschung des indogermanischen Altertums [Comparative Linguistics and Protohistory. Historical Linguistic Contributions to the Research on the Early Indo-European History] (in German) (1st ed.). Jena: Costenoble.
- Schrader, Otto (1890). Sprachvergleichung und Urgeschichte. Linguistisch-historische Beiträge zur Erforschung des indogermanischen Altertums [Comparative Linguistics and Protohistory. Historical Linguistic Contributions to the Research on the Early Indo-European History] (in German) (2nd ed.). Jena: Costenoble.
- Thieme, Paul (1953). "Die Heimat der indogermanischen Gemeinsprache" [The homeland of the common Indo-European language]. Abhandlungen der geistes- und sozialwissenschaftlichen Klasse (11). Mainz: Akademie der Wissenschaften und der Literatur, Wiesbaden.
