= North European hypothesis =

Obsolete linguistic and archaeological theory

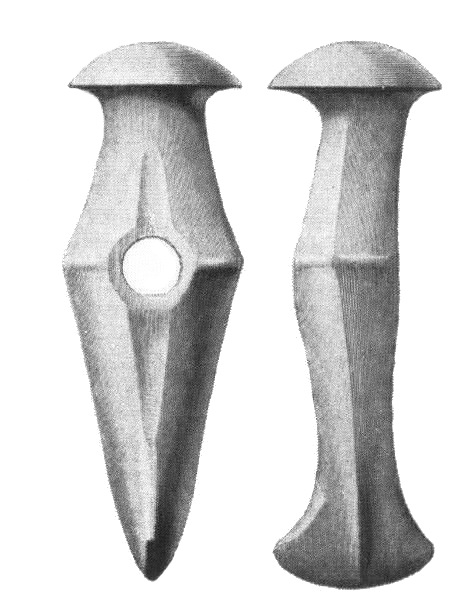
Neolithic stone-axe from Sweden

The North European hypothesis is a linguistic and archaeological theory that tries to explain the spread of the Indo-European languages in Europe and parts of Asia by locating the original homeland (Urheimat) in southern Scandinavia or in the North German Plain. This hypothesis, advanced by Karl Penka, Hermann Hirt, Gustaf Kossinna and others, had some success in the late 19th century and the early 20th century. However, given its association with Nazism, and even more decisively given the subsequent rise of the Kurgan hypothesis (developed out of the more general steppe hypothesis of the 19th century), (Note: See: Mallory: "The Kurgan solution is attractive and has been accepted by many archaeologists and linguists, in part or total. It is the solution one encounters in the Encyclopædia Britannica and the Grand Dictionnaire Encyclopédique Larousse."; Strazny: "The single most popular proposal is the Pontic steppes (see the Kurgan hypothesis)...".) it is now a fringe theory only supported by a minority of scholars, typically in a variant known as the Neolithic creolisation hypothesis.

== Overview ==
According to Penka, the first to propose a Nordic Urheimat, the primitive Indo-European people had to be sedentary farmers native of the north, formed without external interference since the Paleolithic. The presence of a term to indicate copper (*ayes) in the reconstructed Proto-Indo-European vocabulary would restrict the homeland (Urheimat) in a culture of the late Neolithic or the Chalcolithic. Terms in favor of a northern location would be, among others, the ones to indicate the beech (bhāghos) and the sea (*mori). Another issue was the Salmon problem. Others, such as Kossinna, identified specifically the Chalcolithic Corded Ware culture (c. 2900–2300 BC, but at the time known as Battle-Axe culture or, in German, Streitaxtkultur, and dated to c. 2000 BC) with the Proto-Indo-Europeans.

For Boettcher, the very first period of formation of the future proto-Indo-European peoples began in the late Paleolithic, when global warming, which followed the Würm glaciation, allowed to the hunter-gatherers settled in the glacial shelters to repopulate northern Europe, now free of ice. They gave rise to archaeological manifestations such as the Hamburg culture and the Federmesser culture. In these areas of the north are common boreal phenomena apparently described in some Indo-European myths. These groups of hunters and fishermen are the basis of the next Maglemosian culture (9000–6500 BC approximately). The rising of the sea level in northern Europe caused the flooding of part of the territories occupied by Maglemosians (Doggerland) and drove them south. The heirs of this culture developed the cultures of Ertebølle and Ellerbek. Boettcher compares their activities with those of the Vikings of the following millenniums. They are described as a developing warrior society, which deals with trade and piracy, going up the rivers to raid the lands occupied by the Danubian farmers of the southern plains, subduing them and become their leaders.

The fusion of these two populations gave rise to the Funnelbeaker culture (4200–2600 BC), extended from the Netherlands to north-western Ukraine, which would be the original habitat of the first Indo-Europeans. For Jean Haudry, "The Neolithic Funnelbecker culture agrees well with the traditional image of the Indo-European peoples confirmed by linguistic paleontology: in this culture there are simultaneously breeding and plant cultivation, the horse, the wagon and the battle axe, fortifications and signs of a hierarchically organized society". The first Indo-European culture would be then a synthesis of the Ertebølle culture and the final stages of the Linear Pottery culture. This prehistoric fusion of two different populations would explain some common myths to the Indo-European mythology that were studied by Georges Dumézil, such as the Rape of the Sabines in Rome and the war between the Æsir and Vanir of Norse mythology, which would show the union between warrior groups and groups of producers/farmers.

Later cultures, such as the Globular Amphora culture and the Corded Ware culture, would represent the expansion of the Indo-Europeans (or Indogermanen according to this hypothesis) from their original locations in the North European Plain toward Russia (Middle Dnieper culture, Fatyanovo–Balanovo culture) and Asia (Koban culture). Similar movements of Nordic populations would have radiated from Northern Europe to Western and Southern Europe, including Anatolia (Troy), between the Bronze Age and the Iron Age.

=== Association with Nazism ===
The Nazis subscribed to the Northern European hypothesis, believing in a Nordic-Aryan master race that was placed at the top of their racial hierarchy relative to other Aryan types and to non-Aryan races. The Nazis placed the Nordic-Germanic racial type at the top of their racial hierarchy.

== See also ==
- Nordic Stone Age
- Proto-Indo-European homeland
- Salmon problem
- Beech argument
