= A. Richard Diebold Jr. =

American linguistic anthropologist (1934–2014)

- Born: January 20, 1934; New York City, US
- Died: March 1, 2014 (aged 80); Tucson, Arizona, US
- Known for: Solving the salmon problem

Academic background
- Education: Yale University

Academic work
- Discipline: Linguistic anthropology
- Institutions: University of Arizona
- Main interests: Indo-European studies
- Notable works: The Evolution of Indo-European Nomenclature for Salmonid Fish (1985)

Albert Richard Diebold Jr. (January 20, 1934 - 1 March 2014) was an American linguistic anthropologist who was Professor of Anthropology at the University of Arizona. He specialized in Indo-European studies.

== Biography ==
Albert Richard Diebold Jr. was born in New York City, New York on January 20, 1934, the son of Albert Richard Diebold and Dorothy Orizondo. He was educated at Buckley School and Hotchkiss School. He enrolled at Yale University in 1956, receiving his PhD in 1962. He was subsequently a researcher and professor at Harvard University, University of California, Berkeley and Stanford University. Diebold joined the University of Arizona in 1974, where he retired as professor emeritus of Anthropology in 1992.

Diebold was a linguistic anthropologist who specialized in comparative and historical Indo-European studies, theoretical linguistics, psycholinguistics and transcultural psychiatry. He was known as a world-class expert on the Indo-European languages. His The Evolution of Indo-European Nomenclature for Salmonid Fish (1985) is credited with having solved the salmon problem and having firmly shown that the linguistic evidence supports the Kurgan hypothesis, which argues in favor of a Proto-Indo-European homeland located on the Pontic–Caspian steppe. Together with Edgar C. Polomé, Diebold co-edited the Journal of Indo-European Studies Monograph Series, which has published more than 34 monographs. Polomé was friend of J. P. Mallory, who would eventually assume many of his duties at the journal. Diebold was deeply interested in research on Mesoamerican ethnic groups, particularly the Huave people, and contributed greatly to the survival of that people. Diebold founded and directed the Salus Mundi Foundation, which funded research on Indo-European studies; from 2001 until his death in 2005, he funded field work toward dictionaries of indigenous languages of Mexico by the Project for the Documentation of the Languages of Meso-America. Diebold was a great fan of the Middle-earth legendarium of J. R. R. Tolkien.

Diebold died in Tucson, Arizona on March 1, 2014. He was survived by a daughter and a grandson. The Diebold Professor of Comparative Philology at Oxford University is named after him.

== Selected works ==
- The Evolution of Indo-European Nomenclature for Salmonid Fish, 1985
- Introduction to a Dictionary of Some Languages and Dialects of Afghanistan, 2004

== See also ==
- C. Scott Littleton
- David W. Anthony

== Sources ==
- Markey, Tom (2014). "A. Richard Diebold, Jr". Journal of Indo-European Studies. 42 (1): 209–210. ProQuest 1525426947.
- "In Memoriam: Richard Diebold". University of Arizona. March 2014.
- Pearson, Robert (2000). "In Memoriam". Journal of Indo-European Studies. 28 (1): 1–2. ProQuest 206746250.
- University Communications (March 31, 2014). "In Memoriam: Richard Diebold". University of Arizona.
- "Diebold". The New York Times. March 9, 2014. p. 28. ProQuest 1942703754.
- "Diebold". Arizona Daily Star. March 9, 2014. p. C6.
