= Beech argument =

Old argument in Indo-European studies

The beech argument (German: Buchenargument) is a now outdated argument in Indo-European studies that is in favour of placing the Indo-European Urheimat in an area west of a line connecting Kaliningrad and the Black Sea, based on the current distribution of European beech trees. The argument, as summarised by Friedrich and Mallory goes that the Indo-European term *bʰāg(ó) most probably refers to the beech tree. Hence the presence of descendants of the term *bʰāg(ó) in Italic, Germanic, Albanian, Greek and (Indo-)Iranian, and potentially Celtic, Slavic, and Baltic languages, indicates that this word belonged to the Proto-Indo-European language. And thirdly that since the beech tree distribution was limited historically to the regions west of the Eurasian Steppe, this is where this language was spoken.

Current distribution map of Fagus sylvatica (European beech)

However much like the similar salmon problem, the argument is now outdated; because the beech tree is climatically sensitive, the historical distribution of the beech tree was different from that of today, with certain species potentially extending to the Don River or to the Caucasus, and with the exception of the Kurdish buz, the related words for beech are only found in Western Indo-European languages.

== See also ==
- Comparative method (linguistics)
- North European hypothesis
- Salmon problem
