= Johann Friedrich Kleuker =

German theologian and teacher

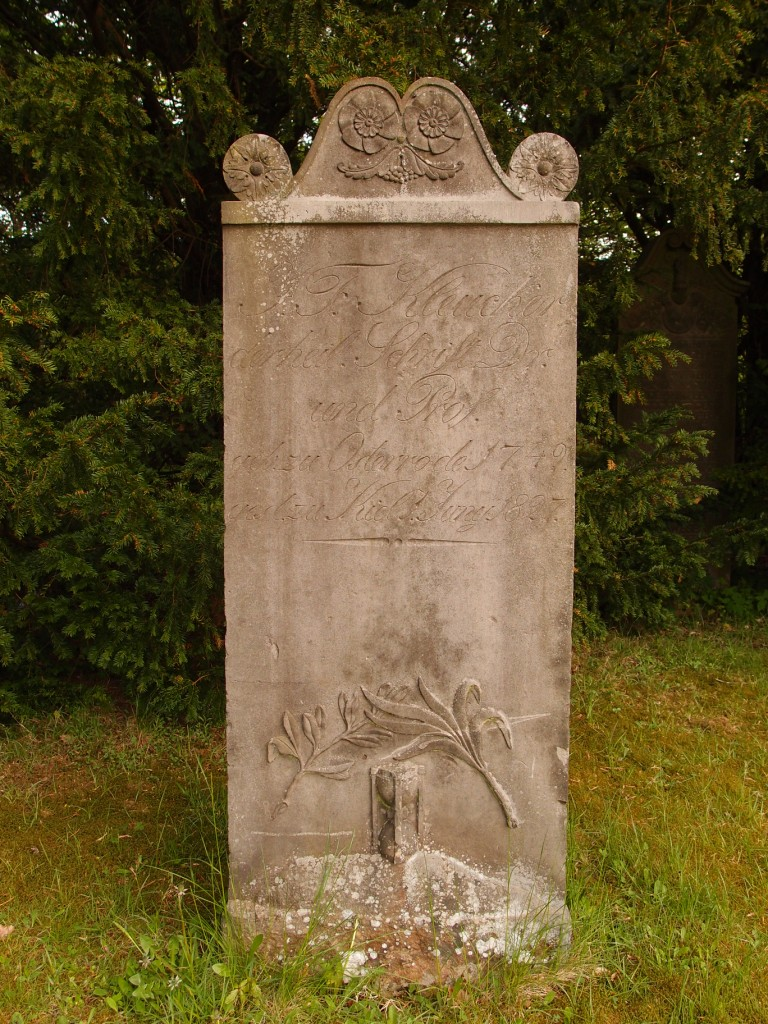
Grave of Johann Friedrich Kleuker, Eichhof Park Cemetery, Kiel

Johann Friedrich Kleuker (born 24 October 1749; died 1 June 1827 in Kiel) was a German Protestant theologian and University professor.

== Career ==
In 1770 Kleuker started his studies in theology, philology and philosophy at the Georg August University of Göttingen. In 1773 started working as a tutor in Bückeburg, where he became friends with Johann Gottfried Herder. In 1775 Herder gave Kleuker the position of vice-rector in Lemgo. In 1778 he became a secondary school principal in Osnabrück. In 1798 Kleuker became professor of theology at the University of Kiel.
