= Theodor Poesche =

German anthropologist

Theodor Friedrich Wilhelm Poesche (23 March 1825 – 27 December 1899) was a German American anthropologist and author, specializing in historical anthropology.

== Life ==
Born in 1825 in Zoeschen (now part of Leuna) in the Province of Saxony of the Kingdom of Prussia, Poesche became a student of philosophy at the University of Halle and later a revolutionary. After the counterrevolution in 1850, he emigrated to the United States. In 1853, he published The New Rome, or The United States of the World, a book in which he compares the United States to the Roman Empire.

In 1878, he published The Aryans: A contribution to historical anthropology. Based on the physical characteristics attributed to Indo-Europeans (fair hair, blue or light eyes, tallness, slim hips, fine lips, a prominent chin) by the philologist Ludwig Geiger, Poesche placed the origin of the Aryans in the vast Rokitno Marshes, then in the Russian Empire, now covering much of the southern part of Belarus and the north-west of Ukraine, where albinism was common. Similarly, he argued that the Lithuanian language is as near to the parent language of Indo-European as Sanskrit. Adding linguistic and archaeological arguments, Karl Penka later expanded the area of origin to include northern Germany and Scandinavia.

Poesche died in Washington on 27 December 1899.

== Works ==
- The New Rome, or The United States of the World (with Charles Goepp), New York, 1853
- Die Arier, ein Beitrag zur historischen Anthropologie, Jena, 1878
