= Otto Schrader (philologist) =

German philologist

Otto Schrader (28 March 1855, Weimar – 21 March 1919, Breslau) was a German philologist best known for his work on the history of German and Proto-Indo-European vocabulary dealing with various aspects of material culture, such as the names of domesticated plants and animals, the names of the metals, etc. Among his most significant works was his linguistic theory, the 'Lachsargument' or the Salmon argument, wherein he hypothesised that as the names for salmon are similar across the Germanic, Baltic, and Slavic languages, these languages must have a common root, and the people who spoke that root language must have originated from a land bordering a water body with salmon. He used this theory to argue that the homeland of the Indo-European people must be in the Baltic region, an argument that has since been widely contested.

== Education and early life ==
Schrader came from a civil servant family in Thuringia, attended Gymnasium in Weimar, and studied in Jena, Leipzig, and Berlin. When he received the Dr. phil. degree, in 1878 he received a teaching position at the Großherzogliches Gymnasium in Jena. There he received his habilitation in 1887 and in 1890 received the title of Professor. In 1909 he moved to Breslau, where he was an "ordentlicher Professor". In 1879 Schrader married Marie von Wilms, with whom he had four children. He described himself as a national liberal.

== Support of Hehn's Theory ==
Schrader supported Victor Hehn's thesis that the Indo-Europeans were originally nomads. According to this thesis, they domesticated only the horse, which they ate. Since there are no common Indo-European words for donkey or camel, Schrader assumed that the original homeland of the Indo-Europeans was in the steppes north of the Black Sea, on the Caspian Sea, and on the Aral Sea, an area referred to as the Pontic–Caspian steppe, where wild horses were a native species. Schrader's theory would ultimately serve as the basis of Marija Gimbutas' Kurgan theory.

== Publications ==
No complete list of Schrader's works has been compiled up to now, so the list below is incomplete.

- Quaestionum dialectologicarum Graecarum particula, Dissertation, Leipzig 1877
- Die älteste Zeittheilung des indogermanischen Volkes, Berlin 1878
- Aus der Geschichte der Hausthiere. Eine linguistische Studie, in: Nord und Süd 15 (1880), pp. 335–348.
- Sprachvergleichung und Urgeschichte. Linguistisch-historische Beiträge zur Erforschung des indogermanischen Altertums, 1st edn. Jena 1883, 2nd edn. Jena 1890, 3rd edn. Jena 1906.
- Thier- und Pflanzengeographie im Lichte der Sprachforschung. Sammlung gemeinverständlicher wissenschaftlicher Vorträge, Heft 427 (1883), Berlin 1884.
- Victor Hehn. Kulturpflanzen und Hausthiere in ihrem Übergang aus Asien nach Griechenland und Italien sowie in das übrige Europa: Historisch-linguistische Skizzen, new edition by Otto Schrader. With botanical contributions by Adolf Engler, 6th edn. Berlin 1884, 7th edn. 1902, 8th edn. 1911
- Linguistisch-historische Forschungen zur Handelsgeschichte und Warenkunde, vol. 1, Jena 1886
- Über den Gedanken einer Kulturgeschichte der Indogermanen auf sprachwissenschaftlicher Grundlage, Jena 1887. Probevorlesung vom 7. Februar 1887
- “Etymologisches und Kulturhistorisches”, ZVS 30, N.F. 10 (1890): 461–485
- Sprachvergleichung und Urgeschichte, vol. 2. Jena: Hermann Costanoble 1890
- Prehistoric antiquities of the Aryan peoples: a manual of comparative philology and the earliest culture. Trans. Frank Jevons. New York: Scribner and Welford, 1890.
- “Linguistisch-historisches”, in Symbola doctorum Ienensis gymnasii in honorem gymnasii Isenacensis collecta. Edited by Gustav Richter. Jena: 1895.
- “Etymologisch-Kulturhistorisches”, in Philologische Studien, Festgabe für Eduard Sievers zum 1. Oktober 1896. Halle: 1896, pp. 1–11
- Vom neuen Reich ("Deutsches Reich und Deutscher Kaiser", "Die Deutschen und das Meer"), zwei sprachlich-geschichtliche Vorträge. Allgemeiner Deutscher Sprachverein, Berlin 1897
- Reallexikon der indogermanischen Altertumskunde: Grundzüge einer Kultur- und Völkergeschichte Alteuropas, 1st edn. Strassburg: Trübner, 1901; 2nd edn., edited by Alfons Nehring, Berlin–Leipzig: 1917–1929.
- “Nachwort”, in Victor Hehn, Das Salz, eine kulturhistorische Studie, 2nd edn. Berlin 1901
- Über den stand der indischen philosophie zur zeit Mahāvīras und Buddhas; Leipzig, Druck von G. Kreysing, 1902.
- Die Schwiegermutter und der Hagestolz. Eine Studie aus der Geschichte unserer Familie, Braunschweig 1904
- Totenhochzeit. Ein Vortrag gehalten in der Gesellschaft für Urgeschichte zu Jena, Jena 1904
- “Über Bezeichnungen der Heiratsverwandtschaft bei den indogermanischen Völkern”, IF 17 (1904).
- Johannes Hoops, Waldbäume und Kulturpflanzen im germanischen Altertum, Straßburg 1905, review, in: Deutsche Literaturzeitung 1906
- Hermann Hirt, Die Indogermanen, ihre Verbreitung, ihre Urheimat und ihre Kultur, vol. 1. Strassburg 1905, review, in: Deutsche Literatur-Zeitung 7/1906
- Hermann Hirt, Die Indogermanen, ihre Verbreitung, ihre Urheimat und ihre Kultur, vol. 2. Strassburg 1907, review, in: Deutsche Literatur-Zeitung [...]/1907
- “Zu nhd. ‘buche’”, in Zeitschrift für deutsche Wortforschung 11 (1909).
- Bilder aus dem russischen Dorfleben, in: Westermanns Monatshefte 53. Jahrgang, Jan.-März 1909, with eight black and white illustrations
- Der Hammelsonntag. Eine Reisestudie aus dem Gouvernement Olonetz. In: IF 26 (1909)
- (Stichworte) “Aryan Religion; Blood-Feud; Charms and Amulets; Chastity; Crimes and Punishments; Death and Disposal of the Death; Divination; Family; Hospitality; Kingship”, in James Hastings, Encyclopaedia of Religion and Ethics, vols. 2-7. Edinburgh: 1909-1914
- Begraben und Verbrennen im Lichte der Religions- und Kulturgeschichte. Ein Vortrag in der Schlesischen Gesellschaft für Volkskunde, Breslau 1910
- “Neuhochdeutsch „Wirt“ (hospes)”, in Wissenschaftliche Beihefte zur Zeitschrift des Allgemeinen deutschen Sprachvereins, V. Reihe, Heft 32, 1910.
- Die Indogermanen. Wissenschaft und Bildung 77, Leipzig 1911, new edition by Hans Krahe, Leipzig 1935
- Die Anschauungen Viktor Hehns von der Herkunft unserer Kulturpflanzen und Haustiere im Lichte neuerer Forschung, Berlin 1912
- Germanen und Indogermanen. In: Die Geisteswissenschaften 8/1913, sowie in: Korrespondenzblatt des Gesamtvereins der deutschen Geschichts- und Altertumsvereine, 1914.
- „Vaterland“. Gedächtnisrede zur hundertsten Wiederkehr des Geburtstages des Fürsten Bismarck, gehalten am 10. Mai 1915, Breslau 1915
- (Nachruf) Alfons Nehring, Otto Schrader, in: Indogermanisches Jahrbuch 6 (1918), pp. 152–160, Berlin 1920
- (Nachruf) Wilhelm Streitberg, Otto Schrader, in: Frankfurter Zeitung, 11. April 1919

== Literature ==
- Rüdiger Schmitt (2007). "Schrader, Otto". Neue Deutsche Biographie (in German). Vol. 23. Berlin: Duncker & Humblot. pp. 511–512.
- Rüdiger Schmitt (1999). "Nebeneintrag zu Schrader, Otto in Artikel Nehring, Alfons". Neue Deutsche Biographie (in German). Vol. 19. Berlin: Duncker & Humblot. pp. 40–40.
