= Karl Penka =

Austrian philologist and anthropologist

Karl Penka (26 October 1847, Mohelnice – 10 February 1912, Vienna) was an Austrian philologist and anthropologist. Known for his now-outdated theories locating the Proto-Indo-European homeland in Northern Europe, Penka has been described as "a transitional figure between Aryanism and Nordicism".

== Biography ==
Born in Müglitz, Moravia (now Mohelnice, Czech Republic), Penka was between 1873 and 1906 a master at the Maximiliansgymnasium, a high school for boys, in Vienna.

He studied anthropology from the point of view of comparative linguistics and took a particular interest in the origins of the Indo-Europeans. He used the term Aryan in the linguistic sense, and extended it into a broad term of race and culture. Penka popularised the theory that the Aryan race had emerged in Scandinavia and could be identified by the Nordic characteristics of blue eyes and blond hair. In his 1883 book Origines Ariacae ('Origins of the Aryans'), he proposed that the Indo-European homeland was situated in the far north, corresponding to the Hyperborea of antiquity.

Penka died in Vienna in 1912. He is now seen as a pioneer of racist and anti-Semitic theories in ethnology.

== Selected works ==
- Die Nominalflexion der indogermanischen Sprachen (Vienna, 1878)
- Origines Ariacae. Linguistisch-ethnologische Untersuchungen zur ältesten Geschichte der arischen Völker und Sprachen (Vienna, 1883)
- Die Herkunft der Arier. Neue Beiträge zur historischen Anthropologie der europäischen Völker (Vienna, 1886)
- 'Entstehung der arischen Rasse' in Das Ausland (1891), from p. 132
- Neue Hypothesen über die Urheimat der Arier (Leipzig, 1906)
- O. Schraders Hypothese von der südrussischen Urheimat der Indogermanen (Leipzig, 1908, in series Beiträge zur Rassenkunde, 6)
