= History of the Middle East =

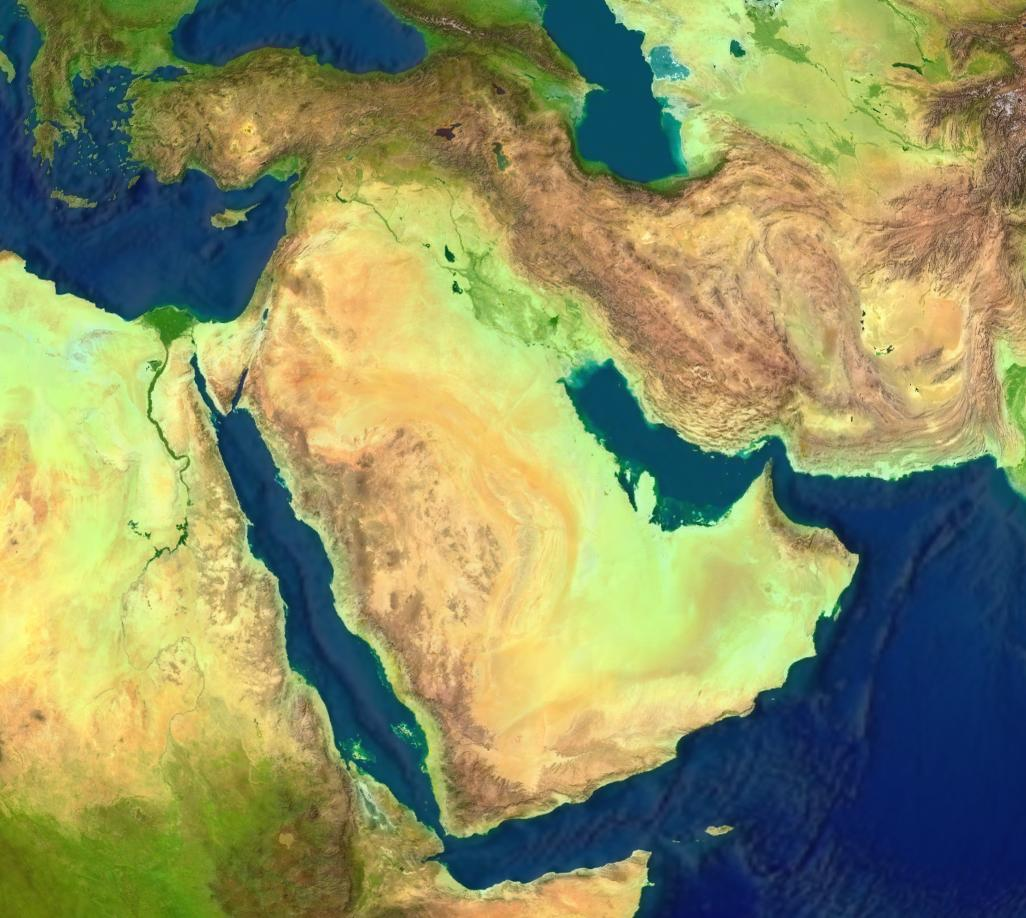
A map showing territories commonly considered part of the Middle East

The Middle East, or the Near East, was one of the cradles of civilization: after the Neolithic Revolution and the adoption of agriculture, many of the world's oldest cultures and civilizations were created there. Since ancient times, the Middle East has had several lingua franca: Akkadian, Hebrew, Aramaic, Greek, and Arabic. The Sumerians, around the 5th millennium BC, were among the first to develop a civilization. By 3150 BC, Egyptian civilization unified under its first pharaoh. Mesopotamia hosted powerful empires, notably Assyria which lasted for 1,500 years. For centuries after the 7th century BC, the region was dominated by Persian powers like the Achaemenid Empire.

In the 1st century BC, the Roman Republic conquered most of the region, and its successor, the Roman Empire, that ruled from the 6th to 15th centuries AD referred to as the Byzantine Empire, grew significantly more. Roman pagan religions were replaced by Christianity in the 4th century AD. From the 3rd to 7th centuries, Rome ruled alongside the Sasanian Empire. From the 7th century, Islam spread rapidly, expanding Arab identity in the region. The Seljuk dynasty displaced Arab dominance in the 11th century, followed by the Mongol Empire in the 13th century.

In the 15th century, the Ottoman Empire invaded most of Anatolia, and dissolved the Byzantine Empire by capturing Constantinople in 1453. The Ottomans and the Safavid dynasty were rivals from the early 16th century. By 1700, the Ottomans were pushed out of Hungary. After the Portuguese colonised Bahrain in 1521, making Bahrain the first Middle Eastern country to be fully colonised by a European power, it opened up pathways for the British Empire to gain control over the Persian Gulf in the 18th and 19th century, whilst the French colonial empire extended into Lebanon and Syria. Regional rulers sought modernization to match European powers. A key moment came with the discovery of oil, first in Persia (1908), then in Bahrain (1932), and other Gulf states later discovering oil, which lead to increased Western interest within the region. In the 1920s to 1940s, Syria and Egypt pursued independence, in 1948 Israel became an independent state.

The British, French, and Soviets withdrew from much of the region during and after World War II. In 1947 the United Nations plan to partition Palestine was voted in favor for a Jewish homeland. Amid Cold War tensions, pan-Arabism emerged in the region. The end of European colonial control, the establishment of Israel, and the rise of the petroleum industry shaped the modern Middle East. Despite economic growth, many countries faced challenges like political restrictions, corruption, cronyism and overreliance on oil. The wealthiest per capita are the small, oil-rich Gulf states, namely Qatar, Kuwait, Bahrain, and the United Arab Emirates.

Several key events shaped the modern Middle East, such as the 1967 Six-Day War, the 1973 OPEC oil embargo in response to US support for Israel in the Yom Kippur War, and the rise of Salafism/Wahhabism in Saudi Arabia that led to rise of Islamism. Additionally, the Iranian Revolution contributed to a significant Islamic revival. The dissolution of the Soviet Union in 1991 ended the Cold War, and regional conflict was soon made part of the war on terror. In the early 2010s, the Arab Spring triggered major protests and revolutions in the region. Clashes in western Iraq in 2013 set the stage for the Islamic State (IS)'s expansion. The Middle Eastern crisis, that began in October 2023 with the October 7th attack on Israel by Hamas has led to profound interconnected events in the region as a result, including the current 2026 Iran war bringing the United States and Iran into a direct military conflict.

== Prehistoric period ==
The earliest human migrations out of Africa occurred through the Middle East, namely over the Levantine corridor, with the pre-modern Homo erectus about 1.8 million years BP. One of the potential routes for early human migrations toward southern and eastern Asia is Persia.

Haplogroup J-P209, the most common human Y-chromosome DNA haplogroup in the Middle East today, is believed to have arisen in the region 31,700 ± 12,800 years ago. The two main current subgroups, J-M267 and J-M172, which now comprise between them almost all of the population of the haplogroup, are both believed to have arisen very early, at least 10,000 years ago. Nonetheless, Y-chromosomes F-M89* and IJ-M429* were reported to have been observed in the Iranian plateau.

Area of the Fertile Crescent, circa 7500 BC, with main sites of the Pre-Pottery Neolithic period

There is evidence of rock carvings along the Nile terraces and in desert oases. In the 10th millennium BC, a culture of hunter-gatherers and fishermen was replaced by a grain-grinding culture. Climate changes and/or overgrazing around 6000 BC began to desiccate the pastoral lands of Egypt, forming the Sahara. Early tribal peoples migrated to the Nile, where they developed a settled agricultural economy and more centralized society.

Ancient Levantines and their descendants exhibit a decrease of ~8% local Neolithic ancestry, which is mostly Natufian-like, every millennium, starting from the Pre-Pottery Neolithic to the Medieval period. It was replaced by Caucasus-related and Anatolian-related ancestries, from the north and west respectively. However, despite the decline in the Natufian component, this key ancestry source made an important contribution to peoples of later periods, continuing until the present. The presence of Neolithic Iranian ancestry among modern Levantines can be attributed to migrations during the Bronze Age.

Neolithic agriculturalists, who may have resided in Northeast Africa and the Middle East, may have been the source population for lactase persistence variants, including ‍–‍13910*T, and may have been subsequently supplanted by later migrations of peoples. The Sub-Saharan West African Fulani, the North African Tuareg, and European agriculturalists, who are descendants of these Neolithic agriculturalists, share the lactase persistence variant ‍–‍13910*T. While shared by Fulani and Tuareg herders, compared to the Tuareg variant, the Fulani variant of ‍–‍13910*T has undergone a longer period of haplotype differentiation. The Fulani lactase persistence variant ‍–‍13910*T may have spread, along with cattle pastoralism, between 9686 BP and 7534 BP, possibly around 8500 BP; corroborating this timeframe for the Fulani, by at least 7500 BP, there is evidence of herders engaging in the act of milking in the Central Sahara.

== Ancient period ==
The ancient Near East was the first to practice intensive year-round agriculture and currency-mediated trade (as opposed to barter), gave the rest of the world the first writing system, invented the potter's wheel and then the vehicular and mill wheel, created the first centralized governments and law codes, served as birthplace to the first city-states with their high degree of division of labor, as well as laying the foundation for the fields of astronomy and mathematics. However, its empires also introduced rigid social stratification, slavery, and organized warfare.

The symbol of the winged sun was found throughout the Middle East. It was associated with divinity, royalty, and power. The symbol shown above is an Egyptian version.

=== Cradle of civilization, Sumer and Akkad ===
The earliest civilizations in history were established in the region now known as the Middle East around 3500 BC by the Sumerians, in southern Mesopotamia (modern-day Iraq), widely regarded as the cradle of civilization. The Sumerians and the Akkadians—who extended their empire to northern Mesopotamia (now northern Syria)—and later Babylonians and Assyrians all flourished in this region.

"In the course of the fourth millennium BC, city-states developed in southern Mesopotamia that were dominated by temples whose priests represented the cities' patron deities. The most prominent of the city-states was Sumer, which gave its language to the area (presumably the first written language), and became the first great civilization of mankind. About 2340 BC, Sargon the Great (c. 2360–2305 BC) united the city-states in the south and founded the Akkadian dynasty, the world's first empire."

During this same time period, Sargon the Great appointed his daughter, Enheduanna, as High Priestess of Inanna at Ur. Her writings, which established her as the first known author in world history, also helped cement Sargon's position in the region.

=== Egypt ===
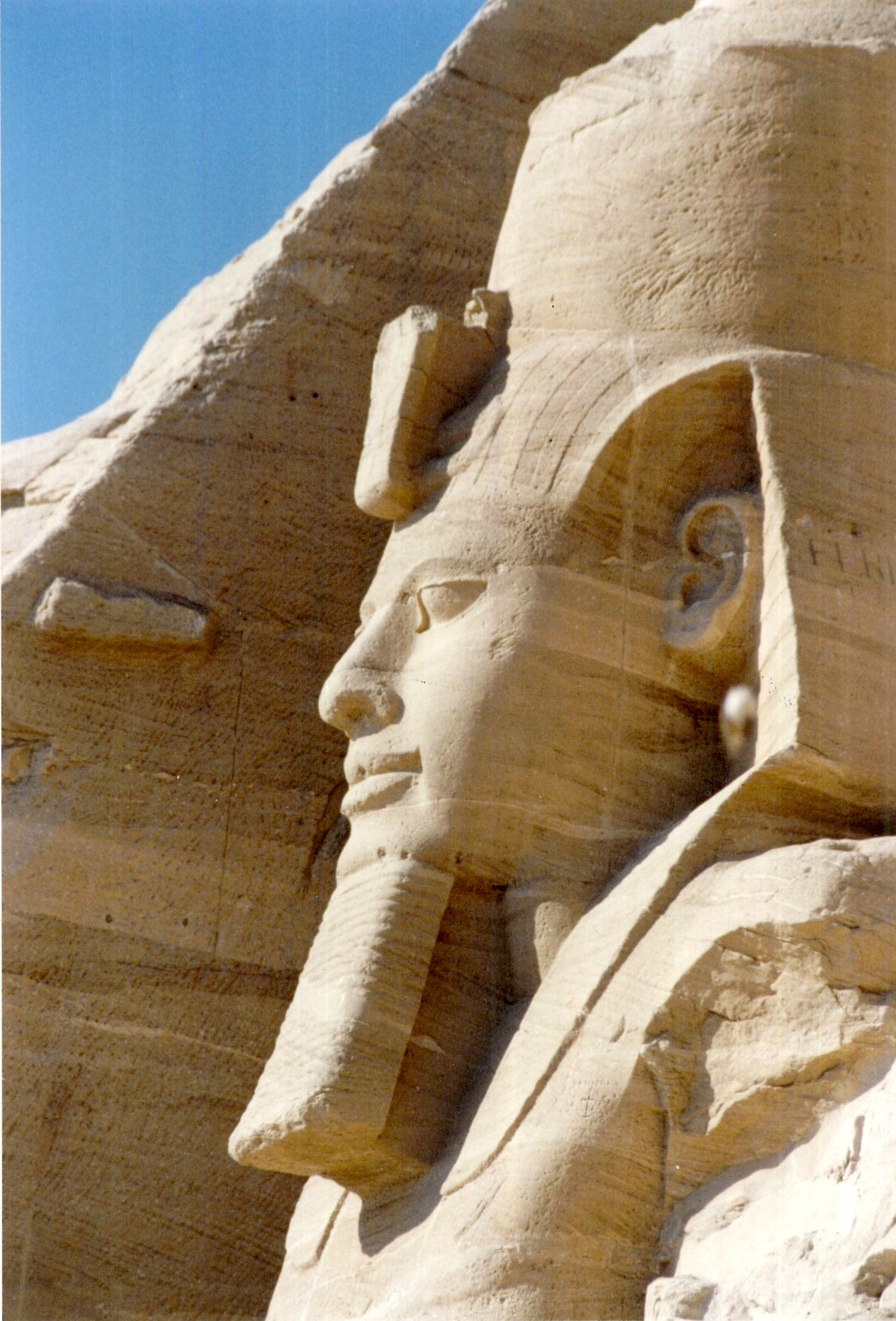
Statue of Ramesses II of Egypt in Luxor.

Soon after the Sumerian civilization began, the Nile valley of Lower and Upper Egypt was unified under the Pharaohs approximately around 3150 BC. Since then, Ancient Egypt experienced 3 high points of civilization, the so-called "Kingdom" periods:

- The Old Kingdom (2686–2181),
- The Middle Kingdom (2055–1650) and, most notably,
- The New Kingdom (1550–1069).

The history of Ancient Egypt is concluded by the Late Period (664–332 BC), immediately followed by the history of Egypt in Classical Antiquity, beginning with Ptolemaic Egypt.

=== The Levant and Anatolia ===
Thereafter, civilization quickly spread through the Fertile Crescent to the east coast of the Mediterranean Sea and throughout the Levant, as well as to Anatolia. Ancient Levantine kingdoms and city states included Ebla, Ugarit, Kingdom of Aram-Damascus, Kingdom of Israel, Kingdom of Judah, Kingdom of Ammon, Kingdom of Moab, Kingdom of Edom, and the Nabatean kingdom. The Phoenician civilization, encompassing several city states, was a maritime trading culture that established colonial cities in the Mediterranean Basin, most notably Carthage, in 814 BC.

=== Assyrian empires ===
Mesopotamia was home to several powerful empires that came to rule almost the entire Middle East—particularly the Assyrian Empires of 1365–1076 BC and the Neo-Assyrian Empire of 911–605 BC. The Assyrian Empire, at its peak, was the largest the world had seen. It ruled all of what is now Iraq, Syria, Lebanon, Israel, Palestine, Kuwait, Jordan, Egypt, Cyprus, and Bahrain—with large swathes of Iran, Turkey, Armenia, Georgia, Sudan, and Arabia. "The Assyrian empires, particularly the third, had a profound and lasting impact on the Near East. Before Assyrian hegemony ended, the Assyrians brought the highest civilization to the then known world. From the Caspian to Cyprus, from Anatolia to Egypt, Assyrian imperial expansion would bring into the Assyrian sphere nomadic and barbaric communities, and would bestow the gift of civilization upon them."

=== Neo-Babylonian and Persian empires ===
From the early 6th century BC onwards, several Persian states dominated the region, beginning with the Medes and non-Persian Neo-Babylonian Empire, then their successor the Achaemenid Empire known as the first Persian Empire, conquered in the late 4th century BC by the very short-lived kingdom of Macedonia of Alexander the Great, and then successor kingdoms such as Ptolemaic Egypt and the Seleucid state in Western Asia.

After a century of hiatus, the idea of the Persian Empire was revived by the Parthians in the 3rd century BC—and continued by their successors, the Sassanids from the 3rd century AD. This empire dominated sizable parts of what is now the Asian part of the Middle East and continued to influence the rest of the Asiatic and African Middle East region, until the Arab Muslim conquest of Persia in the mid-7th century AD. Between the 1st century BC and the early 7th century AD, the region was completely dominated by the Romans and the Parthians and Sassanids on the other hand, which often culminated in various Roman-Persian Wars over the seven centuries. Eastern Rite, Church of the East Christianity took hold in Persian-ruled Mesopotamia, particularly in Assyria from the 1st century AD onwards, and the region became a center of a flourishing Syriac–Assyrian literary tradition.

=== Greek and Roman Empire ===
The Roman Empire at its greatest extent, under Trajan, 117 AD

In 66–63 BC, the Roman general Pompey conquered much of the Middle East. The Roman Empire united the region with most of Europe and North Africa in a single political and economic unit. Even areas not directly annexed were strongly influenced by the Empire, which was the most powerful political and cultural entity for centuries. Though Roman culture spread across the region, the Greek culture and language first established in the region by Macedonia continued to dominate throughout the Roman period. Cities in the Middle East, especially Alexandria, became major urban centers for the Empire and the region became the Empire's "bread basket" as the key agricultural producer. Ægyptus was by far the most wealthy Roman province.

During the time that mystery cults were introduced to the region, traditional religions were often criticized and the cults gained societal influence. These cults formed around gods like Cybele, Isis, and Mithra.

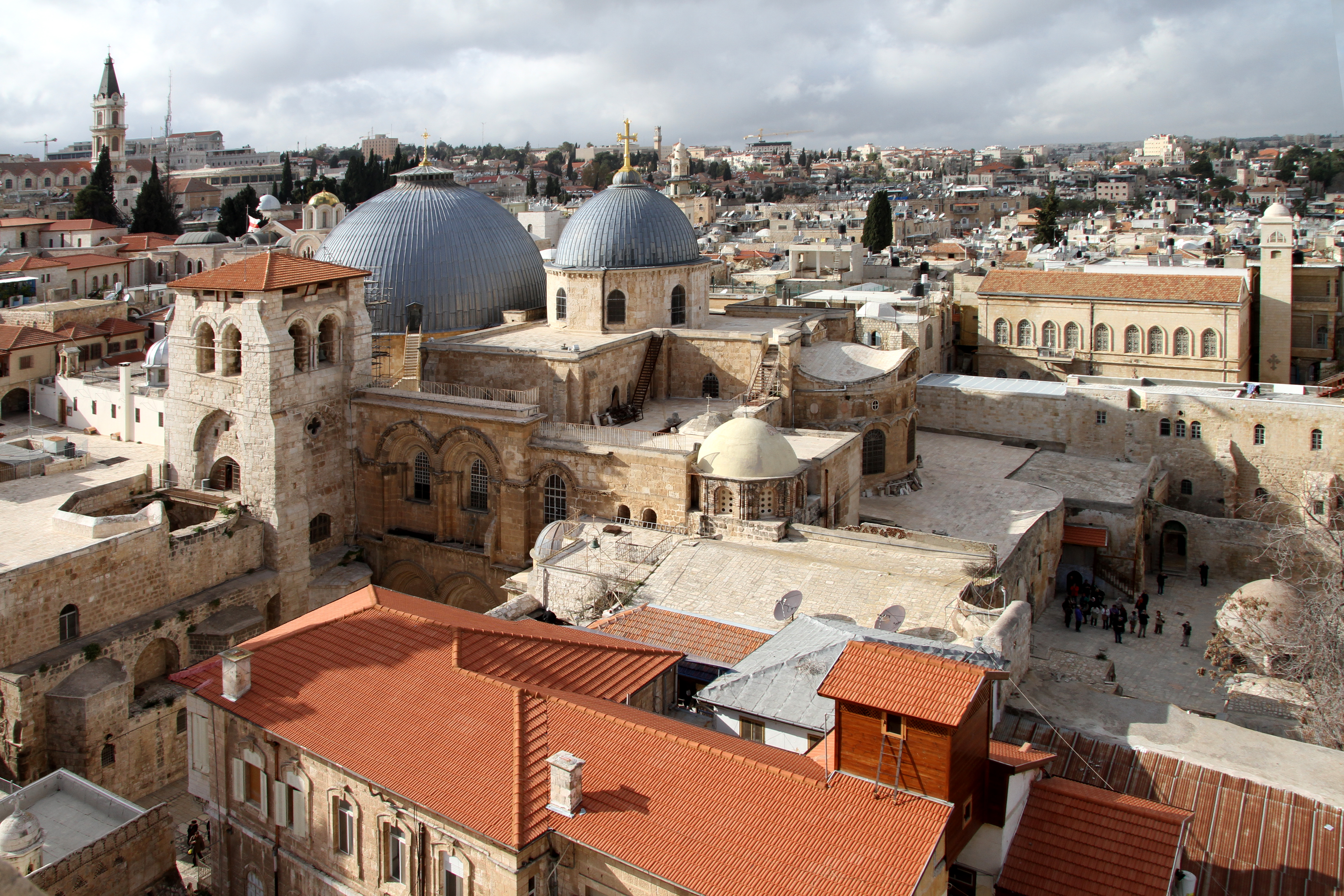
Church of the Holy Sepulchre in Jerusalem: Jerusalem is generally considered the cradle of Christianity.

As the Christian religion spread throughout the Roman and Persian Empires, it took root in the Middle East, and cities such as Alexandria and Edessa became important centers of Christian scholarship. By the 5th century, Christianity was the dominant religion in the Middle East, with other faiths (gradually including heretical Christian sects) being actively repressed. The Middle East's ties to the city of Rome were gradually severed as the Empire split into East and West, with the Middle East tied to the new Roman capital of Constantinople. The subsequent Fall of the Western Roman Empire therefore, had minimal direct impact on the region.

==== Byzantine Empire (Eastern Roman Empire) ====
The Eastern Roman Empire, today commonly known as the Byzantine Empire, ruling from the Balkans to the Euphrates, became increasingly defined by and dogmatic about Christianity, gradually creating religious rifts between the doctrines dictated by the establishment in Constantinople and believers in many parts of the Middle East. By this time, Greek had become the 'lingua franca' of the region, although ethnicities such as the Syriacs and the Hebrew continued to exist. Under Byzantine/Greek rule the area of the Levant met an era of stability and prosperity.

== Medieval period ==
=== Pre-Islam ===
In the period between the 5th and 7th century, the Middle East was generally separated into small, weak states; with the Sasanian Empire of the Persians in what is now Iran and Iraq, and the Byzantine Empire in Anatolia and the Levant dominating the region.The Byzantines and Sasanians fought with each other a reflection of the rivalry between the Roman Empire and the Persian Empire seen during the previous five hundred years. The Byzantine-Sasanian rivalry was also seen through their respective cultures and religions. The Byzantines considered themselves champions of Hellenism and Christianity. Meanwhile, the Sasanians thought themselves heroes of ancient Iranian traditions and of the traditional Persian religion, Zoroastrianism.

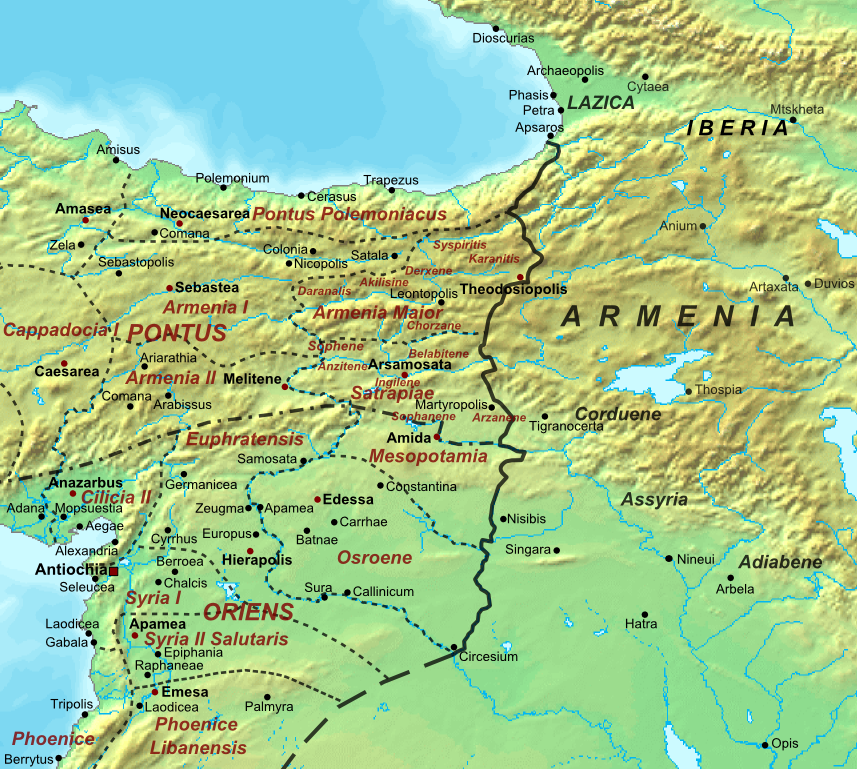
Map of the Roman–Persian frontier after the division of Armenia in 384. The frontier remained stable throughout the 5th century.

The Arabian peninsula already played a role in the power struggles of the Byzantines and Sasanians. While Byzantium allied itself with the Kingdom of Aksum in the horn of Africa, the Sasanian Empire assisted the Himyarite Kingdom in what is now Yemen. Thus the clash between the kingdoms of Aksum and Himyar in 525 displayed a higher power struggle between Byzantium and Persia for control of the Red Sea trade. Territorial wars soon became common, with the Byzantines and Sasanians fighting over upper Mesopotamia and Armenia and key cities that facilitated trade from Arabia, India, and China. Byzantium, as the continuation of the Eastern Roman Empire, continued control of the latter's territories in the Middle East. Since 527, this included Anatolia, Syria, Lebanon, Palestine, and Egypt. In 603 the Sasanians invaded, conquering Damascus and Egypt. It was Emperor Heraclius who was able to repel these invasions, and in 628 he replaced the Sasanian Great King with a more docile one. The fighting weakened both states, leaving the stage open to a new power.

The nomadic Bedouin tribes dominated the Arabian desert, where they worshipped idols and remained in small clans tied together by kinship. Urbanization and agriculture was limited in Arabia, save for a few regions near the coast. Mecca and Medina (then called Yathrib) were two such cities that were important hubs for trade between Africa and Eurasia. This commerce was central to city-life, where most inhabitants were merchants. Nevertheless, some Arabs saw it fit to migrate to the northern regions of the Fertile Crescent, a region so named for its place between the Tigris and Euphrates rivers that offered it fertile land. This included entire tribal chiefdoms such as the Lakhmids in a less controlled area of the Sasanian Empire, and the Ghassanids in a similar area inside of Byzantine territory; these political units of Arab origin offered a surprising stability that was rare in the region and offered Arabia further connections to the outside world. The Lakhmid capital, Hira was a center for Christianity and Jewish craftsmen, merchants, and farmers were common in western Arabia as were Christian monks in central Arabia. Thus pre-Islamic Arabia was no stranger to Abrahamic religions or monotheism, for that matter.

=== Islamic caliphates ===
Age of the Caliphs Expansion under Muhammad, 622–632 Expansion during the Rashidun Caliphate, 632–661 Expansion during the Umayyad Caliphate, 661–750

While the Byzantine Roman and Sassanid Persian empires were both weakened by warfare (602–628), a new power in the form of Islam grew in the Middle East. In a series of rapid Muslim conquests, Arab armies, led by the Caliphs and skilled military commanders such as Khalid ibn al-Walid, swept through most of the Middle East, taking more than half of Byzantine territory and completely engulfing the Persian lands. In Anatolia, they were stopped in the Siege of Constantinople (717–718) by the Byzantines, who were helped by the Bulgarians.

The Byzantine provinces of Roman Syria, North Africa, and Sicily, however, could not mount such a resistance, and the Muslim conquerors swept through those regions. At the far west, they crossed the sea taking Visigothic Hispania before being halted in southern France in the Battle of Tours by the Franks. At its greatest extent, the Arab Empire was the first empire to control the entire Middle East, as well as three-quarters of the Mediterranean region, the only other empire besides the Roman Empire to control most of the Mediterranean Sea. It would be the Arab Caliphates of the Middle Ages that would first unify the entire Middle East as a distinct region and create the dominant ethnic identity that persists today. The Seljuk Empire would also later dominate the region.

Much of North Africa became a peripheral area to the main Muslim centres in the Middle East, but Iberia (Al-Andalus) and Morocco soon broke away from this distant control and founded one of the world's most advanced societies at the time, along with Baghdad in the eastern Mediterranean. Between 831 and 1071, the Emirate of Sicily was one of the major centres of Islamic culture in the Mediterranean. After its conquest by the Normans the island developed its own distinct culture with the fusion of Arab, Western, and Byzantine influences. Palermo remained a leading artistic and commercial centre of the Mediterranean well into the Middle Ages.

=== Islamic culture and science ===
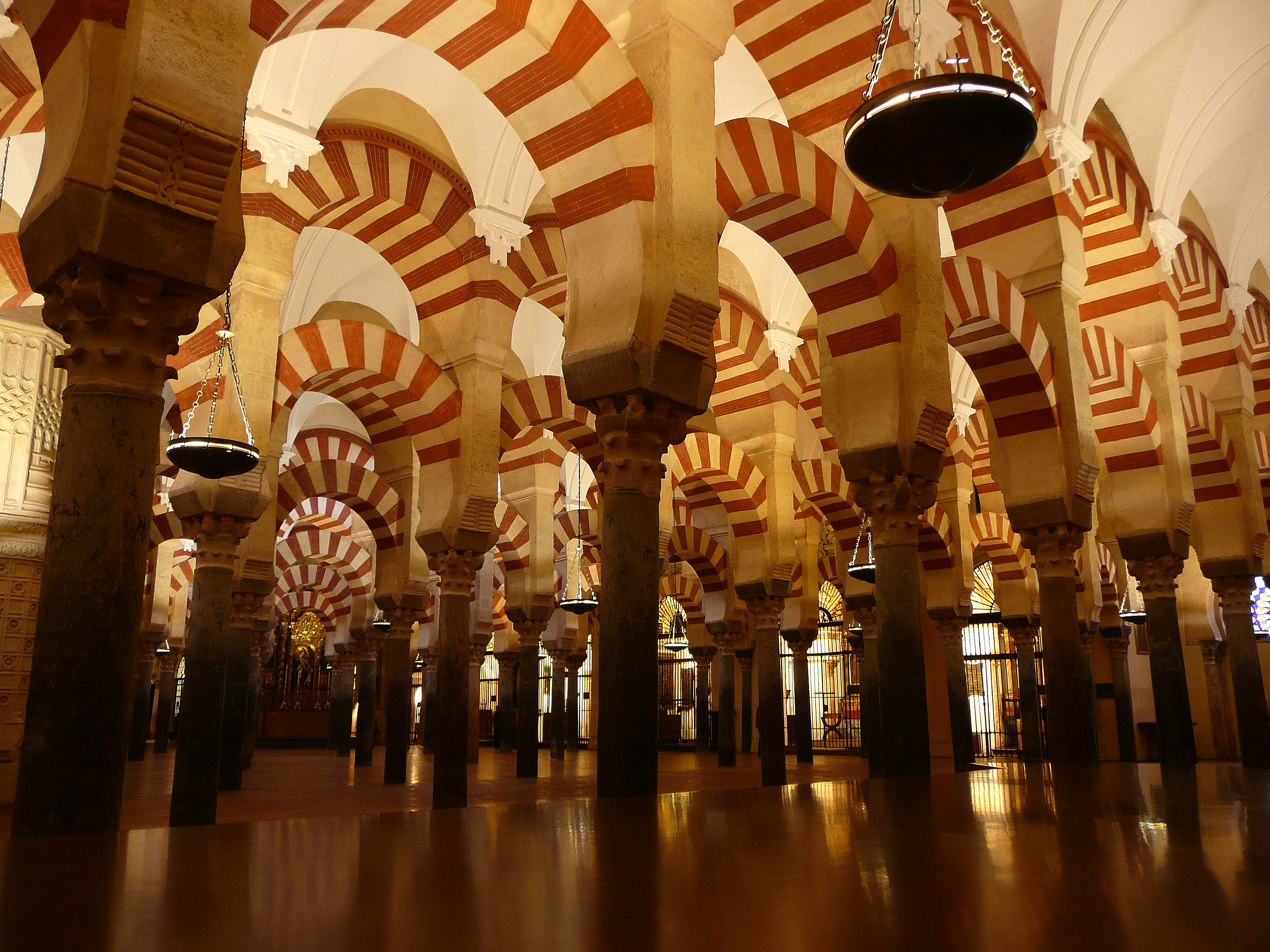
The interior of the former mosque of Córdoba, showing its distinctive arches.

Religion always played a prevalent role in Middle Eastern culture, affecting learning, architecture, and the ebb and flow of cultures. Muhammad's introduction of Islam inspired achievements in architecture, the revival of old advances in science and technology, and the formation of a distinct way of life. Islam primarily consisted of the five pillars of belief, including confession of faith; the five prayers a day; to fast during the holy month of Ramadan; to pay the tax for charity (the zakat); and the hajj, the pilgrimage that a Muslim needed to take at least once in their lifetime. Islam also created the need for spectacularly built mosques which created a distinct form of architecture. Some of the more magnificent mosques include Al-Aqsa and the former Mosque of Cordoba.

Islam unified the Middle East and helped the empires there to remain stable. Missionaries and warriors spread the religion from Arabia to Africa, South and Southeast Asia, and Mesopotamia. This created a mix of cultures, especially in Africa, and the mawali demographic. Although the mawali would experience discrimination from the Umayyad, they would gain widespread acceptance from the Abbasids and it was because of this that allowed for mass conversions in foreign areas. "People of the book" or dhimmi were always treated well; these people included Christians, Jews, Hindus, and Zoroastrians. However, the crusades started a new thinking in the Islamic empires, that non-Islamic ideas were immoral or inferior; this was primarily perpetrated by the ulama (علماء) scholars.

Arabian culture took off during the early Abbasid age, despite the prevalent political issues. Muslims saved and spread Greek advances in medicine, algebra, geometry, astronomy, anatomy, and ethics that would later find its way back to Western Europe. The works of Aristotle, Galen, Hippocrates, Ptolemy, and Euclid were saved and distributed throughout the empire (and eventually into Europe) in this manner. Muslim scholars also discovered the Hindu–Arabic numeral system in their conquests of south Asia. The use of this system in Muslim trade and political institutions allowed for the eventual popularization of it around the world; this number system would be critical to the Scientific Revolution in Europe. Muslim intellectuals became experts in chemistry, optics, and mapmaking during the Abbasid Caliphate. In the arts, Abbasid architecture expanded upon Umayyad architecture, with larger and more extravagant mosques. Persian literature grew based on ethical values. Astronomy was stressed in art. Much of this learning would find its way to the West. This was especially true during the Crusades, as warriors would bring back Muslim treasures, weapons, and medicinal methods.

== 11th century ==
=== Arrival of the Seljuk Turks ===
The dominance of the Arabs came to a sudden end in the mid-11th century with the arrival of the Seljuk Turks, migrating south from the Turkic homelands in Central Asia. They conquered Persia, Iraq (capturing Baghdad in 1055), Syria, Palestine, and the Hejaz. Egypt held out under the Fatimid caliphs until 1169, when it too fell to the Turks.

Despite massive territorial losses in the 7th century, the Christian Byzantine Empire continued to be a potent military and economic force in the Mediterranean, preventing Arab expansion into much of Europe. The Seljuks' defeat of the Byzantine military in the Battle of Manzikert in the 11th century and settling in Anatolia effectively marked the end of Byzantine power. The Seljuks ruled most of the Middle East region for the next 200 years, but their empire soon broke up into a number of smaller sultanates.

=== First Crusade (1096–1099) ===
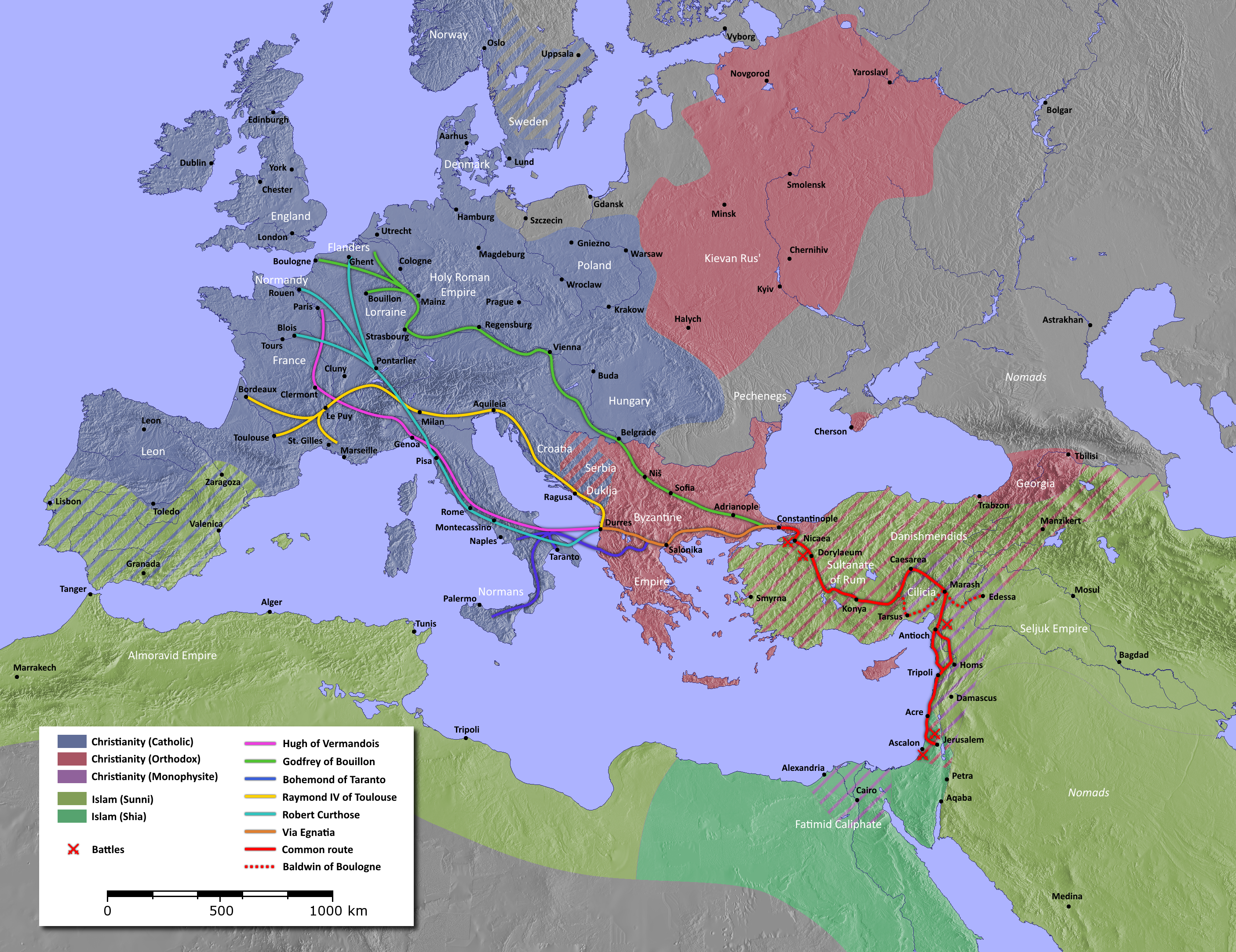
Major routes used by the participants in the First Crusade

The Seljuk victory at the Battle of Manzikert led to them controlling the cities of Edessa and Antioch. Around 1078, the Seljuks formed the Sultanate of Rum, whose capital was at Nicaea in northwest Anatolia. The Seljuks controlled Jerusalem by 1087. Alexios I Komnenos, who became Byzantine emperor in 1081, realized that the Seljuks' growth could help him in his battle for control of Anatolia.

In March 1095, Komnenos appealed to the states west of the Byzantine Empire for help. In November, in the Council of Clermont in France, Pope Urban II called for soldiers from across Europe to go east to take back the "Holy Land" for Christianity. This was an opportunity to strengthen the Catholic Church, and for the Pope to become the head of a unified Catholic and Orthodox church. 60,000 Christians, including thousands of knights, joined the cause, partially in order to protect Christian sites such as the Church of the Holy Sepulchre. This mission, the First Crusade, began in 1096. This was the first of the Crusades, a series of religious wars in Europe and the Middle East from the 11th to the 13th centuries.

The four Crusader states established after the First Crusade, as they were in 1135: the Kingdom of Jerusalem, County of Tripoli, Principality of Antioch, and the County of Edessa

Four large armies headed east: the first was headed by Godfrey of Bouillon, the duke of Lower Lotharingia, and they arrived at Constantinople in December 1096. The second, headed by a Norman from Italy named Bohemond. Raymond IV, Count of Toulouse was the most prominent Crusader at the start of the expedition; he led the third army. The fourth was led by Robert Curthose. The latter three armies reached Constantinople in April 1097. In May, the armies reached Nicaea, which surrendered to the Byzantines. In July, the armies headed for Antioch, reaching the city in October. The city, with strong defensive walls, was besieged by the Crusaders until they took the city in June 1098. In January 1099, three of the armies headed for Jerusalem, while Bohemond stayed in Antioch. In June, the 1099 Siege of Jerusalem started, and the Crusaders took the city in July. The Crusaders massacred the non-Christian population of the city. The First Crusade ended with the establishment of multiple Crusader states in the region: from north to south, the County of Edessa, Principality of Antioch, County of Tripoli, and the Kingdom of Jerusalem.

== 12th century ==
=== 1138 Aleppo earthquake ===
In October 1138, an earthquake struck Aleppo (located on the Dead Sea Transform), which had hundreds of thousands of residents at the time. The city's walls and citadel were destroyed, killing an estimated 230,000 people. Crusader and Muslim forts, at Harem and Atarib respectively, were also destroyed.

=== Second Crusade (1147–1153) ===
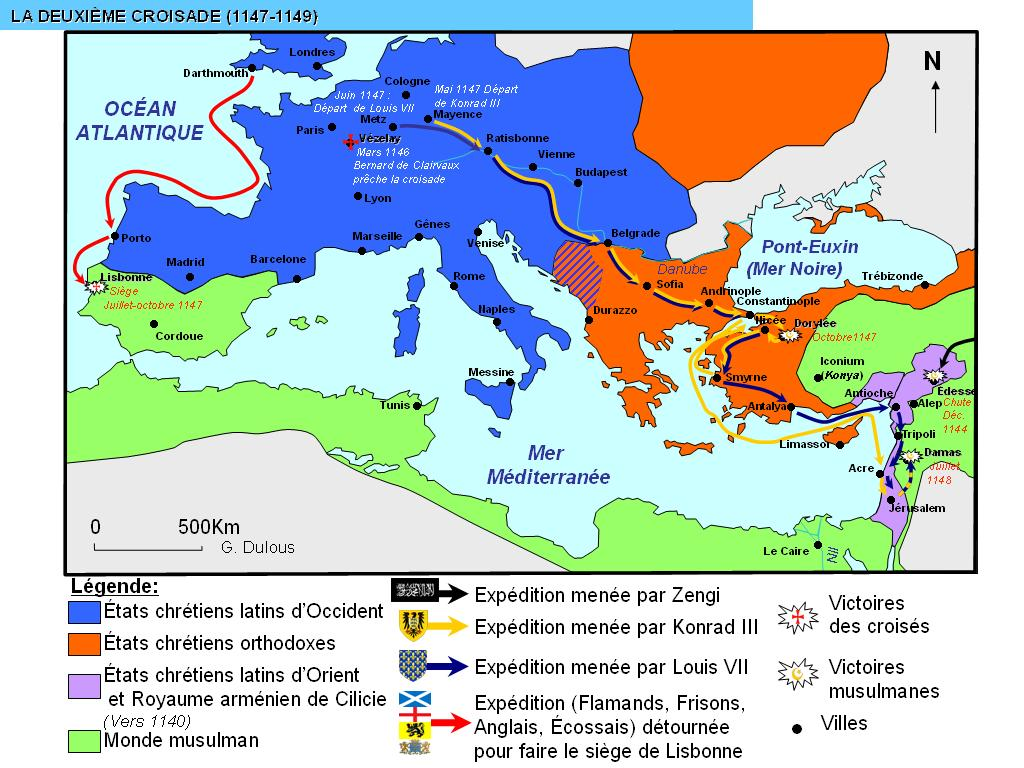
Major routes used by the participants of the Second Crusade

In 1144, the Seljuks took back the city of Edessa, prompting Pope Eugenius III in December 1145 to call for the Second Crusade, protecting the achievements the Crusaders had made decades prior. Unlike the first war, these Crusaders were led by kings; two armies were commanded by Conrad III of Germany and Louis VII of France. In 1147, their armies reached Constantinople. Upon entering the Levant, the Crusaders faced heavy Seljuk resistance, and their war effort began collapsing after failing to take Damascus in 1148. Bernard of Clairvaux, an influential French saint who had advocated for the war, determined that its failure lied in the "sinfulness of Europeans", and only through the "purification and prayers of Christian[s]" would God allow crusading knights to succeed; this became a core tenet of popular piety in medieval Europe.

=== Founding of the Ayyubid dynasty (1171–1187) ===
Najm al-Din Ayyub was the patriarch of a Kurdish warrior family in the mid-12th century. He was appointed by the Seljuks as governor of Damascus, and with his brother Shirkuh, he united the Syrians as one front in preparation for another war with the Crusaders. In 1171, Ayyub's son Saladin, a Sunni living in Egypt, abolished the unpopular and failing Shi'ite Fatimid Caliphate, and founded the Ayyubid dynasty. He was a vassal of his father until Ayyub died in 1173, and then he moved to Syria and proclaimed himself as his father's successor. From 1174 to 1186, in an act of jihad, a type of Islamic religious struggle, Saladin conquered and united the Muslims of Syria, Egypt, Mesopotamia, and Palestine under the Ayyubid banner. He was seen as a "a generous and virtuous but firm ruler, devoid of pretense, licentiousness, and cruelty". In 1187, at the Battle of Hattin, Saladin trapped and destroyed a Crusader army, giving the Ayyubids the opportunity to overrun the Kingdom of Jerusalem and take back its capital.

=== Third Crusade (1189–1192) ===
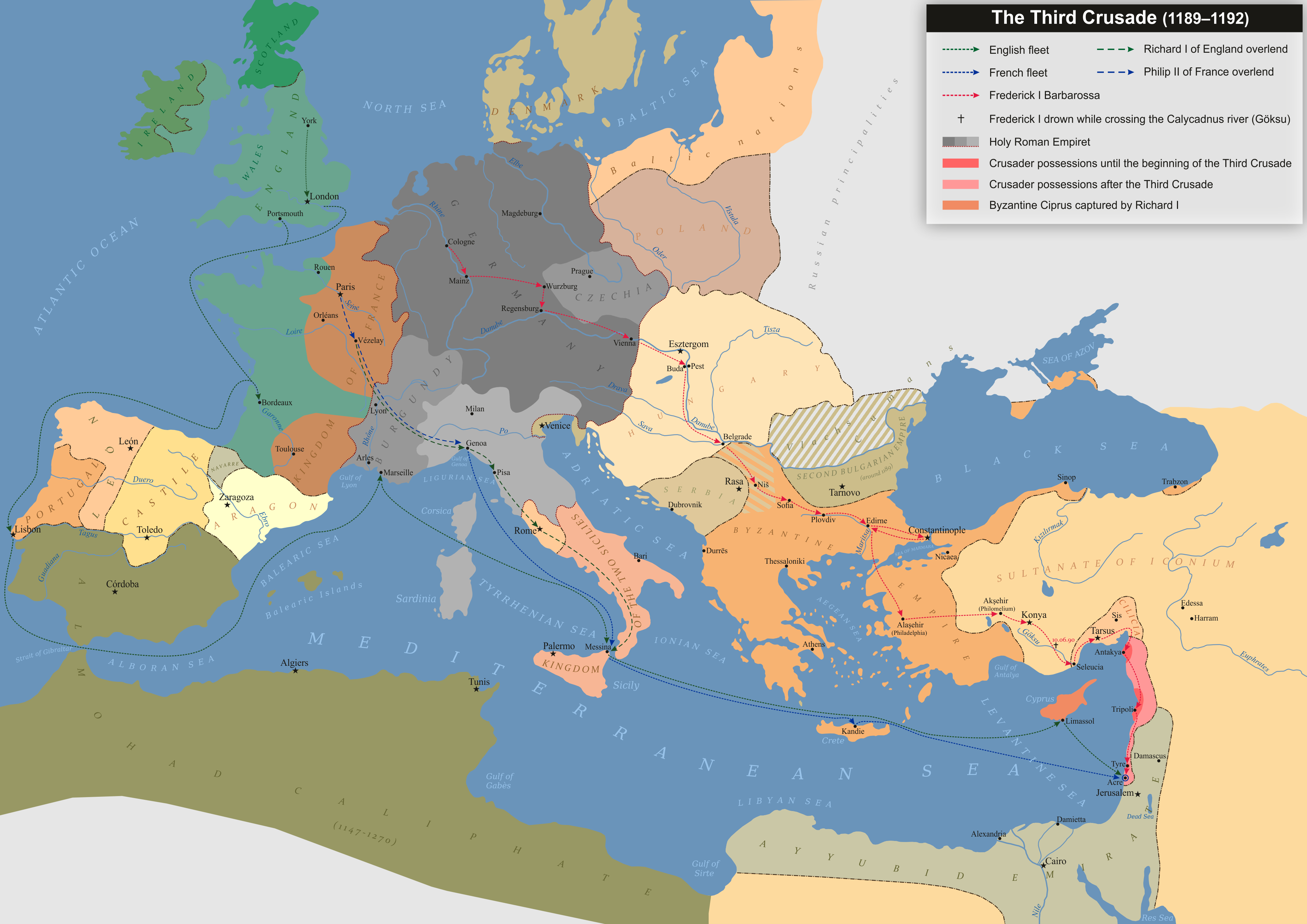
Major routes used by the participants of the Third Crusade

In response to the recapture of Jerusalem, in October 1187, Pope Gregory VII called for the Third Crusade, with similar goals to the previous wars. The new Crusader leaders were Frederick Barbarossa, emperor of the Holy Roman Empire (HRE); Philip II of France; and Richard I of England. In 1190, as Barbarossa's army traveled through Cilicia, he died. Lacking leadership, his soldiers either died, returned to Germany, or, in rare cases, made it to the Levant.

In 1191, the English landed at Cyprus, ending the local rebellion against Byzantine rule led by a man named Isaac Komnenos who proclaimed himself ruler of the island. The Cypriots were forced to pay taxes to the Crusader war effort, and generations of Crusaders controlled the island until 1571. In the Levant in 1191, the English captured the cities of Acre and then Jaffa. In 1192, as the English were garrisoned in Acre, Saladin launched a siege of Jaffa. The English returned to the city and fought the Ayyubids; the battle ended in a stalemate. The English left for home, as Richard I had to deal with domestic affairs, and the Third Crusade ended. Saladin died in 1193.

=== Crusade of 1197 ===
Frederick Barbarossa's successor, Henry VI, set out for the Levant with an army in the Crusade of 1197. The Germans successfully captured Beirut from the Ayyubids, but later that year, Henry VI died in Sicily. In 1198, while the Germans were besieging Toron, they received the news of the emperor's death, and abandoned the siege to return to Germany.

== 13th century ==
=== Fourth Crusade (1202–1204) ===
Jerusalem was still controlled by the Ayyubids in August 1198, when Pope Innocent III called for the Fourth Crusade to once again try recapturing the city for Christianity. At the time, the English, French, German, and Spanish monarchs were dealing with their own domestic affairs; Richard I of England vowed to return to the Middle East to finish the job of taking Jerusalem, but he died in 1199. The Crusader armies were thus commanded by "second-tier" noblemen from France, led by the Italian Boniface I, Marquis of Montferrat.

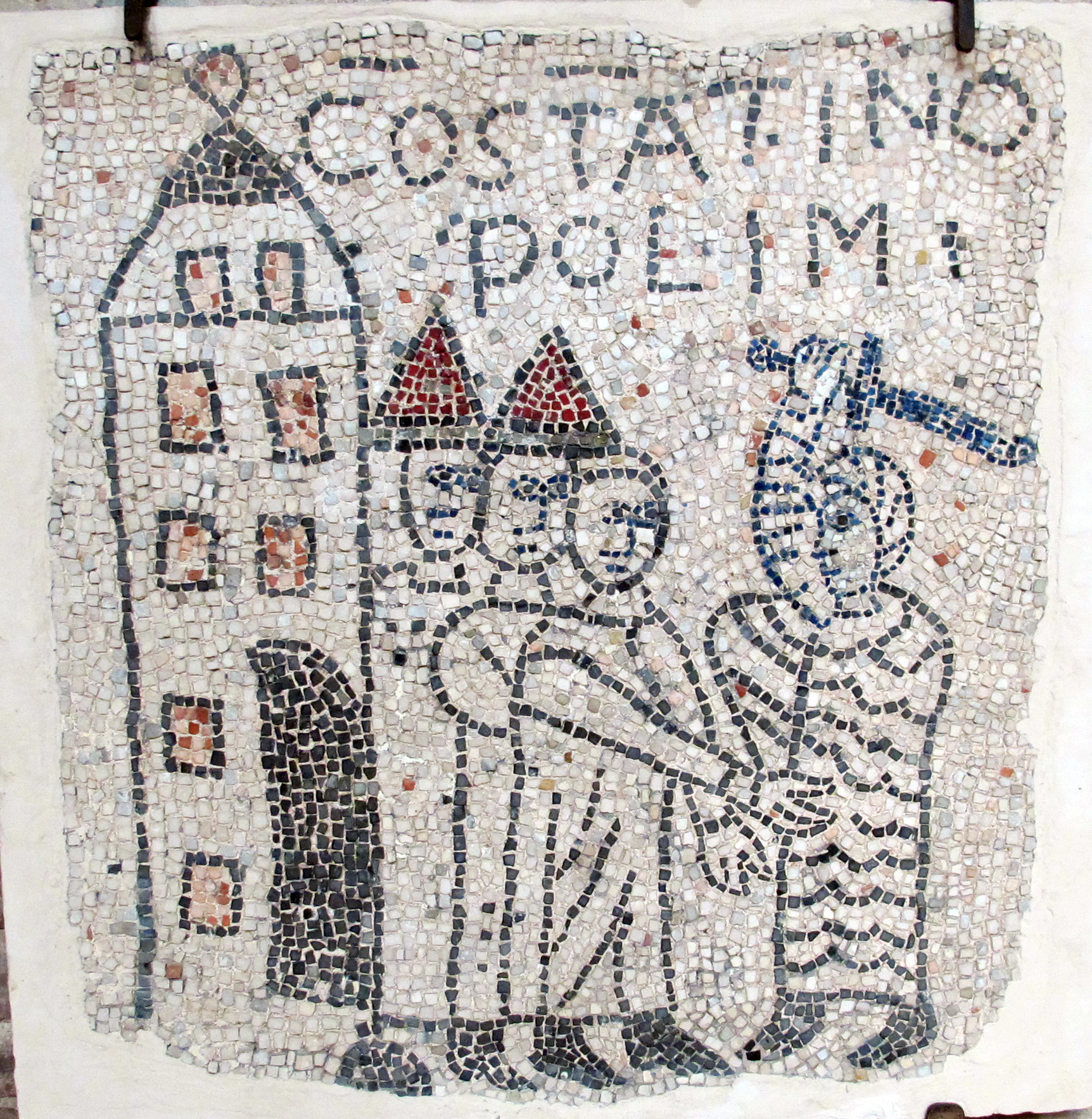
A 1213 Venetian mosaic depicting the 1204 Sack of Constantinople

Boniface; his liege Philip of Swabia; and Alexios IV Angelos—son of Isaac II Angelos, who was Byzantine emperor before he was deposed by his successor, Alexios III Angelos, in 1195; agreed to use the Crusade as an opportunity to storm Constantinople and depose Alexious III. The Crusaders declared war on the Byzantines, and entered Constantinople. In July 1203, Isaac II and Alexios IV were made co-emperors. Alexios III's son-in-law, Alexios V Doukas, was installed as emperor in January 1204. Doukas had Alexious IV strangled to death, and Isaac II imprisoned; the latter died in prison. In April 1204, Doukas demanded the Crusaders leave Constantinople. Instead, they committed the Sack of Constantinople, robbing the city of its wealth and goods. Parts of the Byzantine Empire were given to the Republic of Venice and its allies. Doukas fled the city and met up with Alexios III to join him as fugitives. However, Alexios III blinded him. Doukas was then captured by the Crusaders, who killed him as revenge for ordering Alexious IV's death.

=== Fifth Crusade (1217–1221) ===
In 1215, Pope Innocent III called for another crusade to retake Jerusalem from the Ayyubids. The Fifth Crusade began in 1217. This time, the Crusaders decided to weaken the Ayyubids by capturing their cities in North Africa and Egypt, predicting the dynasty had a weak hold over that area. The Crusaders captured Damietta in Egypt, but in general, their plan did not work, as they had less soldiers, military equipment, and ships than needed; the Crusader leaders also disagreed over how to go about the war. The Ayyubids defeated them on the banks the Nile in August 1221. The Crusaders were forced to abandon Damietta, and once again return to Europe without taking Jerusalem.

=== Mongol invasion of Persia (1218–1223) ===
The growth of the Mongol Empire from 1206 to its partition in 1294; modern political borders are overlaid

The Mongol Empire was founded in modern-day Mongolia in 1206, led by Genghis Khan. He was the first "Khagan", the ruler of all the Mongol peoples. Over 12 years, the Mongols spread out from the eastern Eurasian Steppe into west and east Asia, brutally conquering much of the continent's land with a large army of effective cavalry and archers. In 1218, 100,000 Mongol soldiers entered the Khwarazmian Empire in Persia, and captured the Khwarazmian cities of Bukhara and Samarkand. Muslims were massacred; their irrigation systems and some of their cities were completely destroyed, leading them to nickname Genghis Khan the "Accursed One". From 1221 to 1223, the Mongols conquered the lands encircling the Caspian Sea.

In 1227, Genghis Khan died, and his son Ögedei Khan became the new Khagan. Ögedei split the empire into four areas; one owned by him, and the others individually owned by his three brothers. Tolui received the Middle Eastern quadrant. Initially, this did not mean Ögedei's brothers led the government in their respective areas; he ultimately governed the whole empire for decades.

=== Sixth Crusade (1228–1229) ===
Frederick II became Holy Roman Emperor in 1220, during the Fifth Crusade. His legitimacy as emperor was questioned by Pope Innocent III and Innocent's successor, Honorious III. Before the crusade was over, Frederick promised to go south and join the Crusaders, but this did not happen. After the Crusade ended, he expanded the Holy Roman Empire into central Europe and Sicily, encircling the country of the Papal States which the Pope ruled. Honorious III asked Frederick to honor his pledge to retake Jerusalem, for its own religious sake and to take pressure off of the Papal States. Frederick agreed to start the Sixth Crusade in August 1227, but delayed his departure to illness. Honorious' successor, Gregory IX, then excommunicated Frederick from the Catholic Church as punishment for not following his pledge to go.

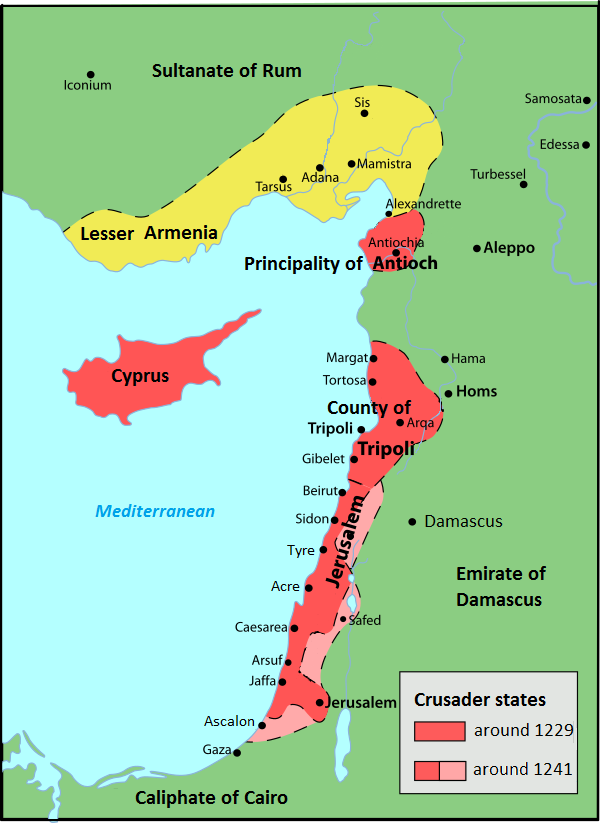
The Crusder states (red) after the Sixth Crusade

This incident did not demotivate Frederick, and he sailed to the Levant with a well-equipped army of 12,000: 10,000 infantry and 2,000 knights. They landed at Acre in September 1228. Frederick entered negotiations with Levantine religious leaders such as those in the Knights Templar and Knights Hospitaller, but they would not negotiate with someone who was now outside the church. Frederick was able to talk with them through military commanders associated with him, but who were seen as technically independent of him. Promising the religious leaders hereditary land and military promotions, Frederick was able to make an agreement in 1229 to expand the Kingdom of Jerusalem's Levantine territory and allow Christians to reoccupy most of Jerusalem.

=== Seventh Crusade (1248–1254) ===
In the fifteen years following the Sixth Crusade, many Ayyubid cities on the Mediterranean coast started allying with the local Crusader states out of convenience. This was because, after the Ayyubid sultan al-Kamil died in 1238, his successors started fighting over control of the region which destabilized these cities. In August 1244, the Muslim Khwarazmians took Jerusalem back from the Christians, and in October, a Christian army was defeated by the Ayyubids at the Battle of Forbie in Gaza, which stabilized and strengthened Ayyubid control. The Christians remaining in Jerusalem were massacred, and their holy sites were destroyed. Pope Innocent IV called for the Seventh Crusade, which was led by Louis IX of France. Louis wanted to take both Jerusalem and Egypt from the Muslims. The Crusaders captured Damietta in 1249, and then went to Mansourah in 1250, where they were routed by a Muslim army. Louis was captured and ransomed back to the Crusaders, who returned home once again.

=== Founding of the Mamluk Sultanate (1250) ===
Mamluks were enslaved Muslim soldiers who made up armies in the Abbasid Caliphate. These armies had Mamluk generals, who, in 1250, formed the Mamluk Sultanate of Egypt, expanded in Hejaz and the Levant. The Egyptian sultanate was a sovereign state, acting ceremonially as a part of the Abbasid government, and ruled for centuries. These Mamluks had no relation to the Mamluk dynasty in India, which also existed in the 13th century.

=== Siege of Baghdad (1258) ===
A 1350 illustration of the 1258 Siege of Baghdad by the Mongol Empire

The siege of Baghdad and the death of Abbasid Caliph al-Musta'sim in 1258 temporarily ended the caliphate. When the Khagan Möngke Khan died in 1259, any further Mongol expansion in the region was halted, as the regional military leader Hulegu Khan had to return to the Mongol capital Karakorum for the election of a new khagan. His absence resulted in the first defeat of the Mongols by the Egyptian Mamluks during the Battle of Ain Jalut in 1260. Issues began to arise when the Mongols were unable to reach a consensus as to whom to elect Khagan. Additionally, conflict occurred between traditionalists who wished to retain their nomadic culture and Mongols moving towards sedentary agriculture. All of this led to the fragmentation of the empire in 1260. Hulegu carved out his Middle Eastern territory into the independent Ilkhanate, which included most of Armenia, Anatolia, Azerbaijan, Mesopotamia, and Iran.

The Mongols eventually retreated in 1335, but the chaos that ensued throughout the empire deposed the Seljuk Turks.

== 14th century ==
=== Black Death (1346–1353) ===
The spread of the Black Death from 1346 to 1353

The Black Death was a pandemic of the plague that spread throughout the Old World—but mostly Europe, the Middle East, Central Asia, and North Africa—from 1346 to 1353. The disease was caused by bacteria Yersinia pestis, carried to humans by fleas on rodents, and then from human to human. It originated in Central Asia, and was unknowingly brought to Crimea via Mongol warriors, as well as traders (Mongols and others) who used the trade routes that connected Europe and Asia (such as the Silk Road). It is likely that Genoese trading ships—with either infected humans or flea-carrying rats onboard—brought the plague from Crimea to the Byzantine Empire in 1347, when sailing back to Italy through Constantinople. From then until 1349, the Black Death spread from Byzantine territory down through the rest of the Middle East. Around 30% to 50% of the population in any infected area died from the disease.

=== Egypt ===
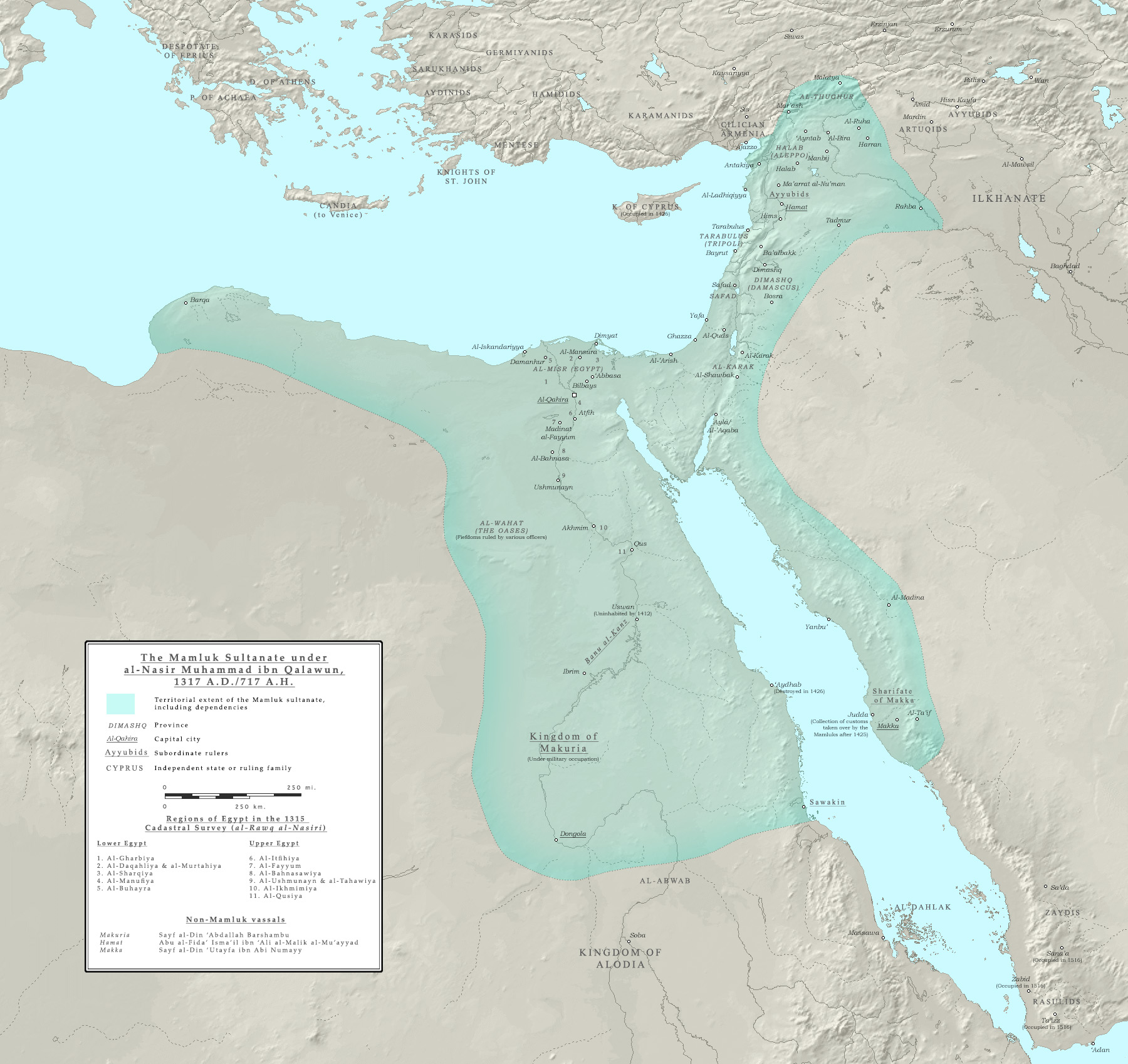
Extent of the domains of the Mamluk Sultanate of Egypt in 1317

The Mamluk Sultanate of Egypt was the wealthiest and most powerful empire in the Islamic world. Its army controlled the Levant and the Hejaz, driving out the last Crusaders and halting the Mongol advance. Leadership was often acquired through military prowess and elite training, not hereditary. This century saw the end of the major Mongol invasions in the Middle East, culminating in a lasting peace treaty in 1323 between the Egyptian Empire and the Ilkhanate. The Egyptians maintained strict control over their borders, dominated vital trade routes, and extended their cultural influence from Mecca and Medina to Aleppo and Jerusalem.

=== Timurid conquest of western Asia (1370–1405) ===
Timur was a warlord who grew up in the Barlas tribe of Turkic Mongols that lived in the region of Transoxiana (roughly modern Uzbekistan), within the Chagatai Khanate (the territory of the Chagatai line of khans descended from Chagatai Khan, son of Genghis Khan). From 1364 to 1366, Timur and his brother-in-law, Amir Husayn, conquered Transoxiana, but around 1370, Timur had Husayn assassinated. In Samarkand, Transoxiana's main city, Timur declared himself a sovereign of the Chagatai line who would restore the Mongol Empire to its former glory. This began the Timurid dynasty that controlled the Timurid Empire.

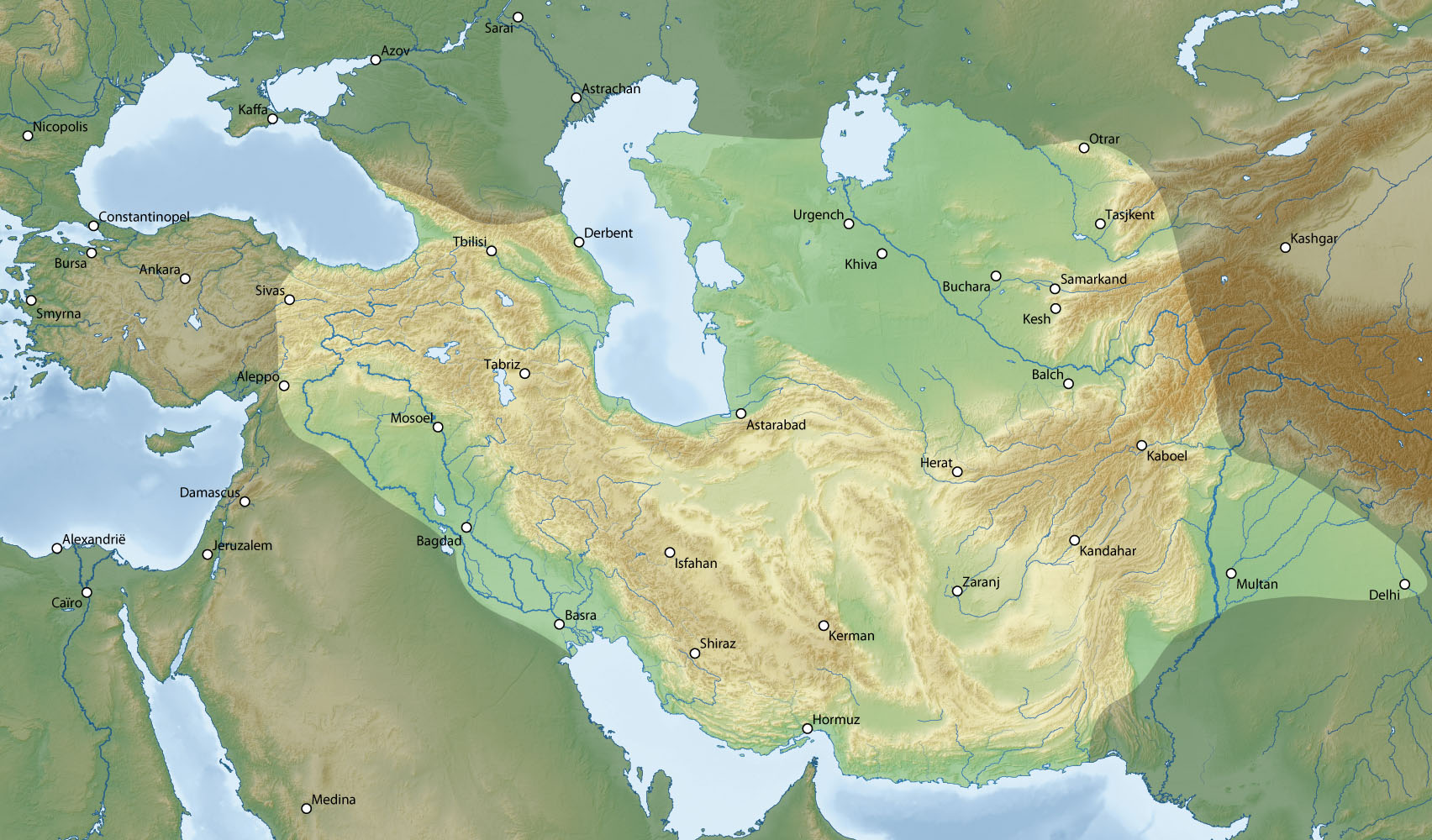
The Timurid Empire upon Timur's death in 1405, its greatest extent

In 1380, the empire conquered the nearby region of Kashgar, and in 1383, Timur entered Persia. From 1383 to 1394, the empire conquered eastern and southern Persia, the Caucasus, and Mesopotamia. In 1399, Timur launched an expedition towards Mamluk and Ottoman territory. Timur regained control of modern Azerbaijan, and then captured Aleppo, which was sacked, before moving to Damascus and reducing the city's power by deporting its artisans to Samarkand. In 1401, the Timurids besieged Baghdad, killing 20,000 of its residents. At the Battle of Ankara in 1402, Timur defeated the army of the Ottoman sultan Bayezid I. Timur received offers of capitulation from the Mamluk sultan and Byzantine emperor, then returned to Samarkand in 1404. In December 1404, Timur set out on a conquest of China, but died in February 1405. Before he died, he had divided his empire's territories between his sons and grandsons.

== 15th century ==
=== Fall of Constantinople (1453) ===
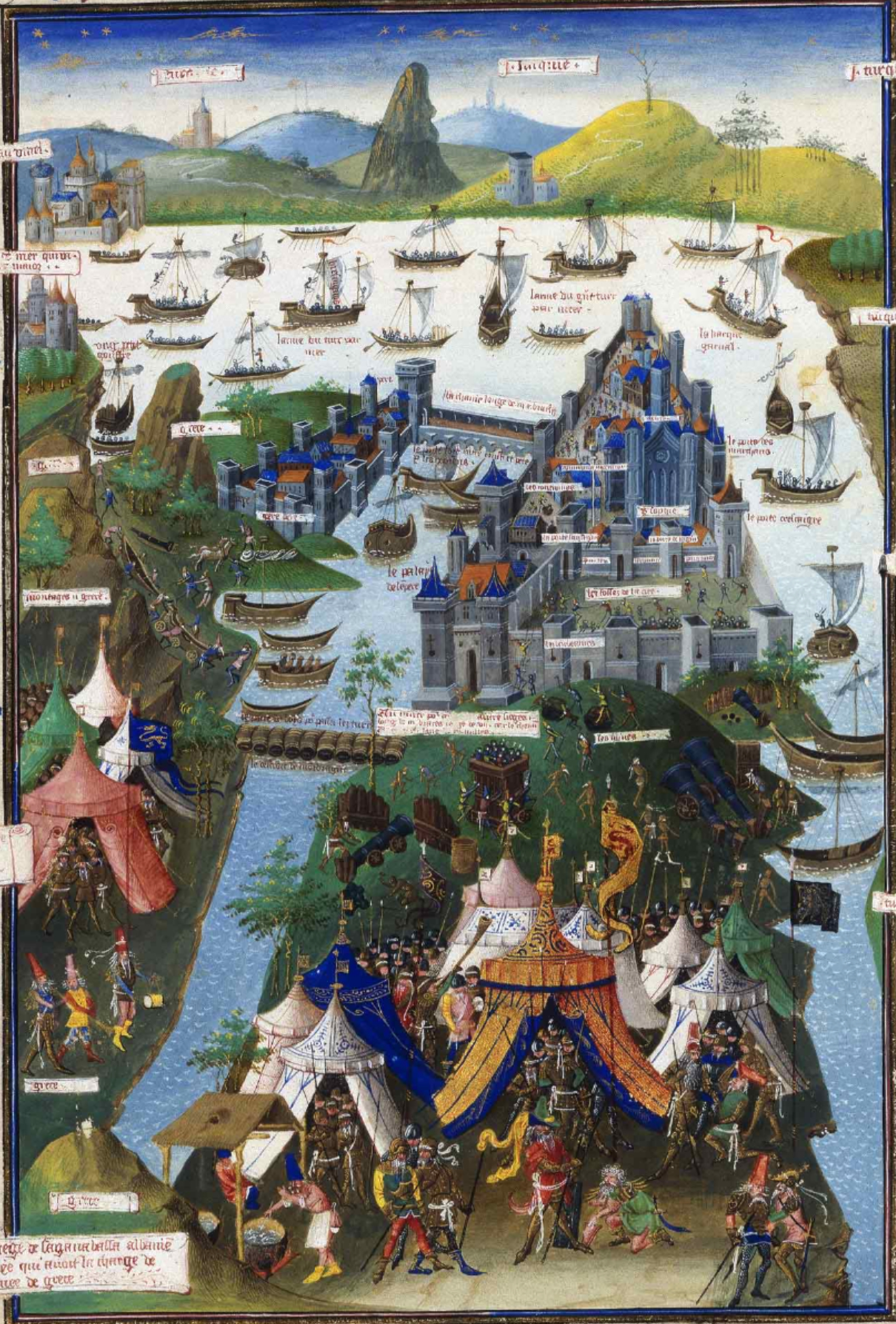
The Fall of Constantinople in 1453, painted after 1455

The Ottomans conquered almost all of Anatolia and the Balkans in the late 14th century, forcing Constantinople into vassalage and then fighting the Hungarians. In 1422, Ottoman sultan Murad II besieged Constantinople, but stopped to deal with another rebellion in the Ottoman Empire. In 1444, Murad suffered a defeat in the Balkans, prompting him to abdicate his throne to his son, Mehmed II. In 1446, Murad returned to being the sultan, and remained as such until he died in 1451, again succeeded by Mehmed.

By the 1450s, a weakened Byzantine Empire had lost much of its territory in wars with the Balkan states and Roman Catholic armies. The population of Constantinople, weakened by two centuries of sporadic raids, had dropped in population from 400,000 in the 12th century to 40,000 to 50,000. Mehmed planned to finish Murad's goal of conquering the city, and in 1452, he made peace with Hungary and Venice. In April 1453, he led an army to Constantinople, and besieged the city. In May, the city fell to the Ottomans, ending the Roman Empire after 1500 years of continuous existence.

== 16th to 17th centuries ==
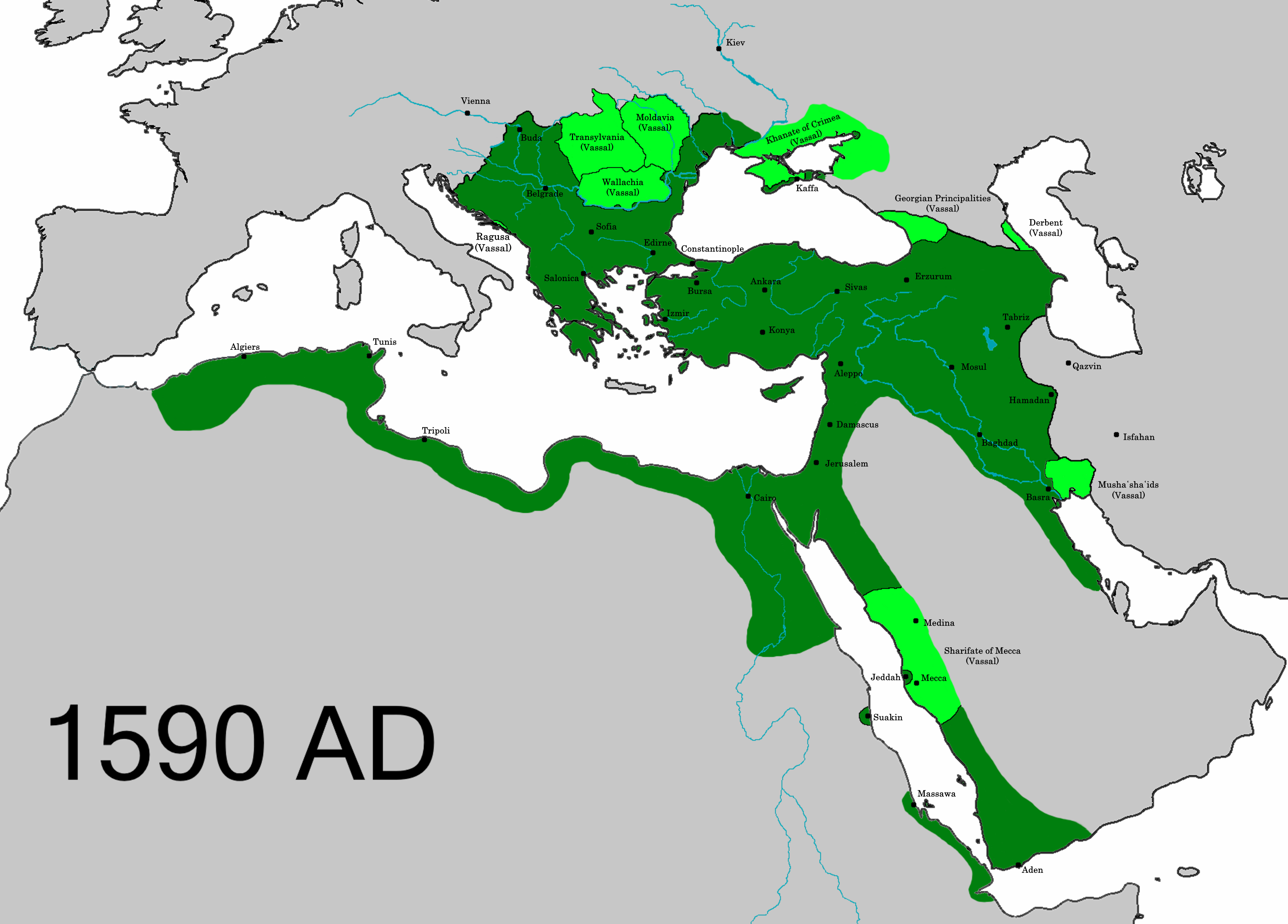
The Ottoman Empire at its greatest extent in the Middle East, including its client states.

By the early 15th century, the Ottomans had become the region's largest power. The Mamluks held them out of the lower Middle East for a century, but in 1514 Selim the Grim began the Ottoman conquest of the region. Syria was occupied in 1516 and Egypt in 1517, extinguishing the Mamluk line. Iraq was conquered almost in 40 years from the Iranian Safavids, who were successors of the Aq Qoyunlu.

The Ottomans united the whole region under one ruler for the first time since the reign of the Abbasid caliphs of the 10th century, and they kept control of it for 400 years, despite brief intermissions created by the Safavids and Afsharids. By this time the Ottomans also held Greece, the Balkans, and most of Hungary, setting the new frontier between east and west far to the north of the Danube. Regions such as Albania and Bosnia saw many conversions to Islam, but Ottoman Europe was not culturally absorbed into the Muslim world.

By 1699, the Ottomans had been driven out of Hungary, the Polish—Lithuanian Commonwealth, and parts of the western Balkans in the Great Turkish War. In the Great Divergence, Europe had overtaken the Muslim world in wealth, population and technology. Some historians argue that science had already been in decline in the Muslim world since the 14th century while other argue that sciences still continued until the 17th century. The Industrial Revolution and growth of capitalism magnified the divergence, and from 1768 to 1918, the Ottomans gradually lost territory.

== 18th century ==
=== Nader Shah ===
Nader Shah has been described as "the last great Asiatic military conqueror". Following his assassination in 1747, his empire quickly disintegrated, and Iran fell into a civil war.

=== French invasion of Egypt and Syria (1798–1799) ===
In February 1798, during the French Revolutionary Wars, the general Napoleon—a leader of the French Directory, the new French government—requested the Directory, who were at war with the British, to cancel their planned invasion of Britain. He instead began planning a French invasion of Egypt, then ruled by the Mamluks. This was intended to halt British trade in the region, make France pose a threat to British possessions in India, and "obtain assets for bargaining in any future peace settlement". France also planned to make a progressive government in Egypt to bring them [the Egyptians] back to their former status. To achieve this, France brought along scholars and scientists to study and report on Egyptian society. Napoleon and his army sailed to Egypt in May 1798.

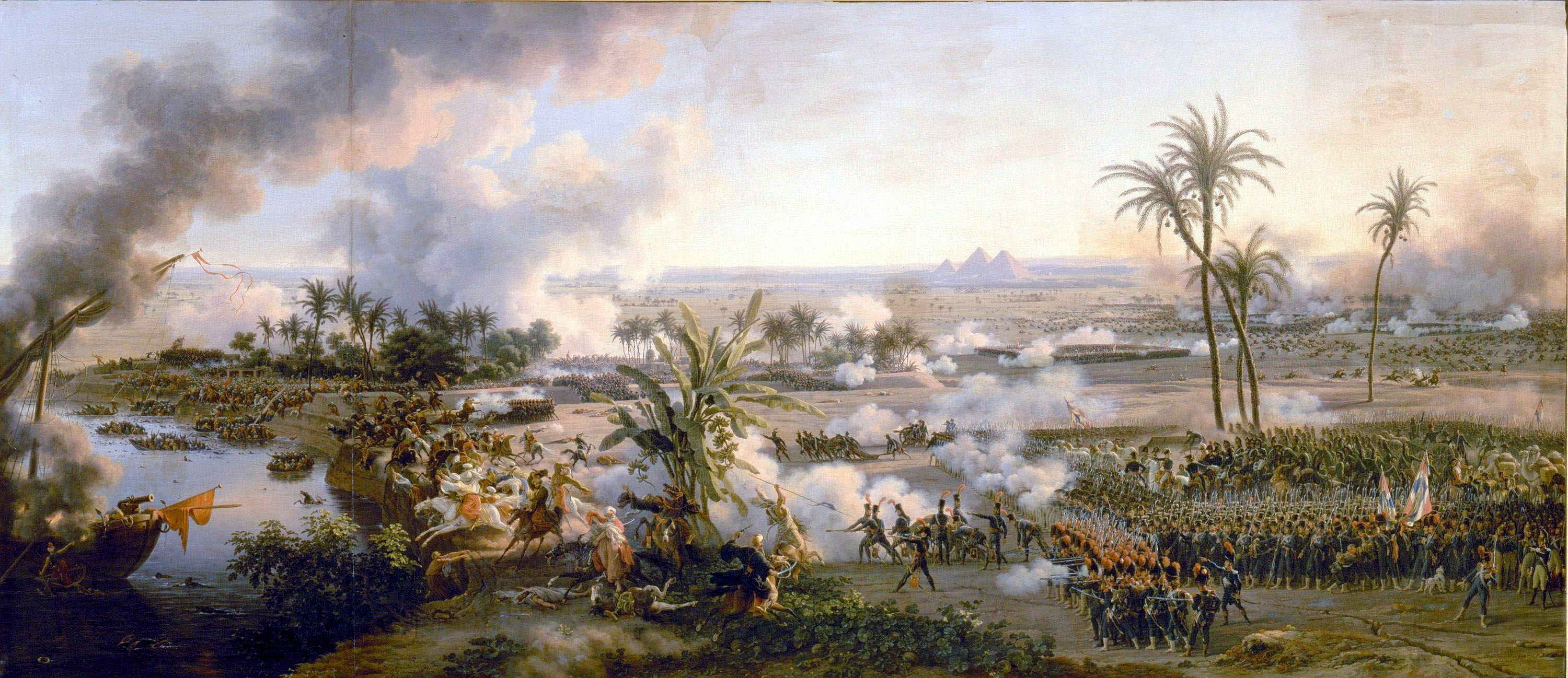
An 1808 painting of the 1798 Battle of the Pyramids

The Royal Navy, commanded by Admiral Horatio Nelson, sailed to Egypt to fight the French navy. On land, in July 1798, the French won against the Mamluks at the Battle of the Pyramids. However, at the Battle of the Nile in August, Napoleon's fleet at Abu Qir was all but destroyed by the British. French communication lines were severed, and Napoleon worked to make his soldiers self-sufficient. The Egyptians resented French occupation, and were further angered in September, when Ottoman sultan Selim III declared war on France. In February 1799, Napoleon marched the French into Ottoman Syria and besieged Acre, a strategic position beneficial for them to capture. The siege failed, and in May, the Napoleon brought his forces back into Egypt. In July, Ottoman naval forces arrived at the shore of Abu Qir, but failed to maintain a bridgehead so they could fight the French on land. Napoleon decided to return to France, and in August, slipped past the British blockade and went home. The remaining French troops were eventually defeated by an Anglo-Ottoman expedition in 1801 and evacuated by the British to Europe.

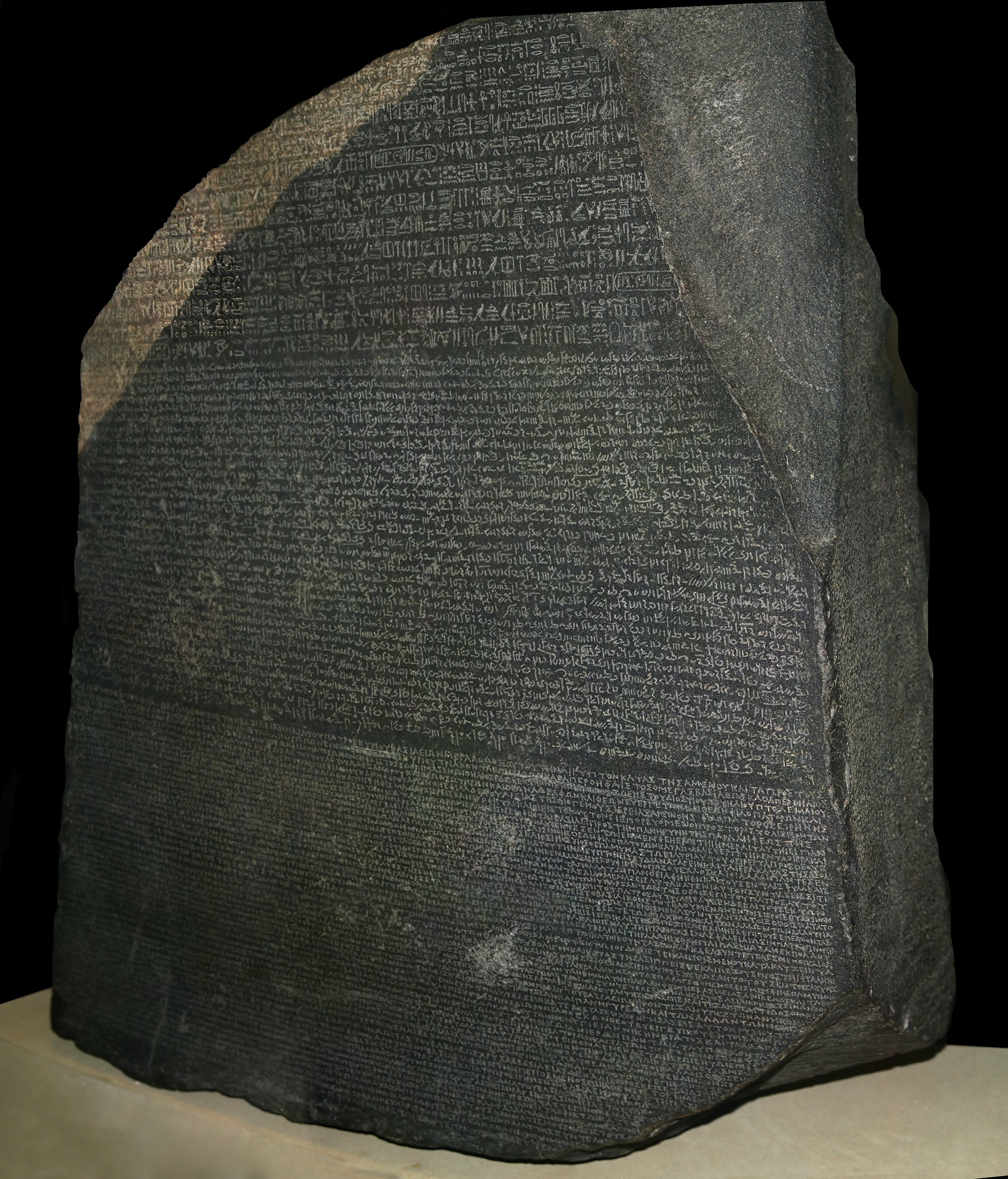
The Rosetta Stone from ancient Egypt which was discovered by the French during their invasion of Egypt

The French researchers who had been studying Egyptian society discovered the Rosetta Stone during their work. It is a stone from ancient Egypt inscribed with the same message written in five different writing systems: two forms of the Greek language, the Egyptian language, and two forms of hieroglyphs. The latter two writing systems were hardly understood by European researchers. They were compared with the Greek and Egyptian alphabets—which European researchers did know—and decoded, leading to new understanding of hieroglyphs.

== 19th century ==
Greece, Serbia, Romania, and Bulgaria achieved independence during the 19th century, and the Ottoman Empire became known as the "sick man of Europe", increasingly under the financial control of European powers. Domination soon turned to outright conquest: the French annexed Algeria in 1830 and Tunisia in 1878 and the British occupied Egypt in 1882, though it remained under nominal Ottoman sovereignty.

In 1878, as the result of the Cyprus Convention, the United Kingdom took over the government of Cyprus as a protectorate from the Ottoman Empire. While the Cypriots at first welcomed British rule, hoping that they would gradually achieve prosperity, democracy and national liberation, they soon became disillusioned. The new colonial administration imposed heavy taxes to pay off Ottoman Crimean War loans (guaranteed by both Britain and France) on which the Ottomans had defaulted. Agitation against the taxation was incessant and became a source of nationalist anger towards the British.

The British also established effective control of the Persian Gulf, and the French extended their influence into Lebanon and Syria. In 1912, the Italians seized Libya and the Dodecanese islands, just off the coast of the Ottoman heartland of Anatolia. The Ottomans turned to Germany to protect them from the western powers, but the result was increasing financial and military dependence on Germany.

== 20th century ==
=== Final years of the Ottoman Empire ===
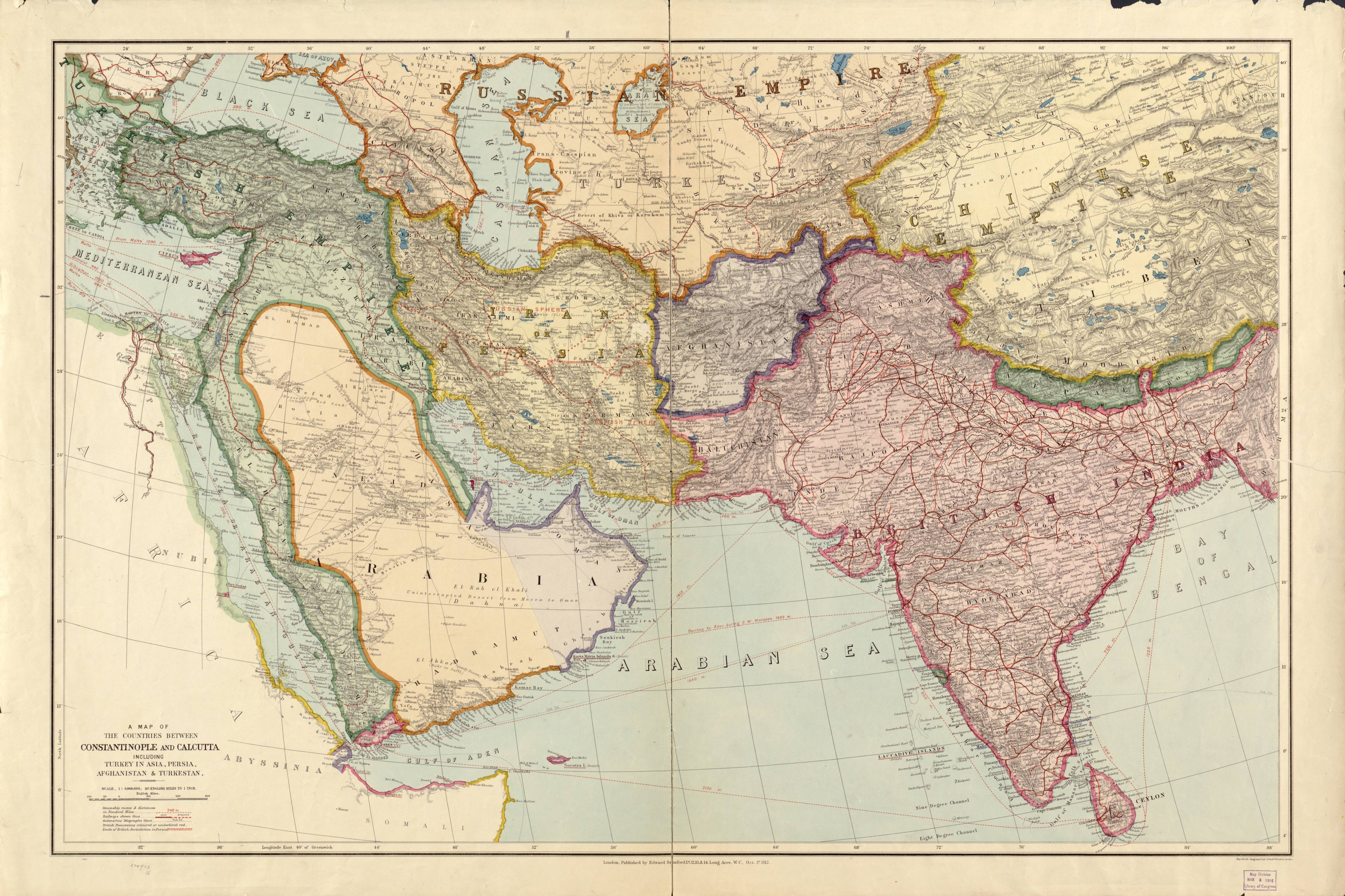
Ottoman Empire on a 1912 map of West Asia

In the late 19th and early 20th centuries, Middle Eastern rulers tried to modernize their states to compete more effectively with Europe. In the Ottoman Empire, the Tanzimat reforms re-invigorated Ottoman rule and were furthered by the Young Ottomans in the late 19th century, leading to the First Constitutional Era in the Empire that included the writing of the 1876 constitution and the establishment of the Ottoman Parliament. The authors of the 1906 revolution in Persia all sought to import versions of the western model of constitutional government, civil law, secular education, and industrial development into their countries. Throughout the region, railways and telegraph lines were constructed, schools and universities were opened, and a new class of army officers, lawyers, teachers, and administrators emerged, challenging the traditional leadership of Islamic scholars.

This first Ottoman constitutional experiment ended soon after it began, however, when the autocratic Sultan Abdul Hamid II abolished the parliament and the constitution in favor of personal rule. Abdul Hamid ruled by decree for the next 30 years, stirring democratic resentment. The reform movement known as the Young Turks emerged in the 1890s against his rule, which included massacres against minorities. The Young Turks seized power in the 1908 Young Turk Revolution and established the Second Constitutional Era, leading to pluralist and multiparty elections in the Empire for the first time in 1908. The Young Turks split into two parties, the pro-German and pro-centralization Committee of Union and Progress and the pro-British and pro-decentralization Freedom and Accord Party. The former was led by an ambitious pair of army officers, Ismail Enver Bey (later Pasha) and Ahmed Cemal Pasha, and a radical lawyer, Mehmed Talaat Bey (later Pasha). After a power struggle between the two parties of Young Turks, the Committee emerged victorious and became a ruling junta, with Talaat as Grand Vizier and Enver as War Minister, and established a German-funded modernisation program across the Empire.

In August 1914, Enver Bey signed an alliance with the German Empire, which he considered the most advanced military power in Europe. It was created as part of a joint effort to strengthen and modernize the weak Ottoman military and to provide Germany with safe passage into the neighbouring British colonies. Germany also needed the Ottoman Empire on its side. The Orient Express had run directly to Constantinople since 1889, and prior to 1914, the Sultan had consented to a plan to extend it through Anatolia to Baghdad under German auspices. That would strengthen the Ottoman Empire's link with the industrialized Europe and give Germany easier access to its African colonies and to trade markets in British India.

=== World War I (1914–1918) ===
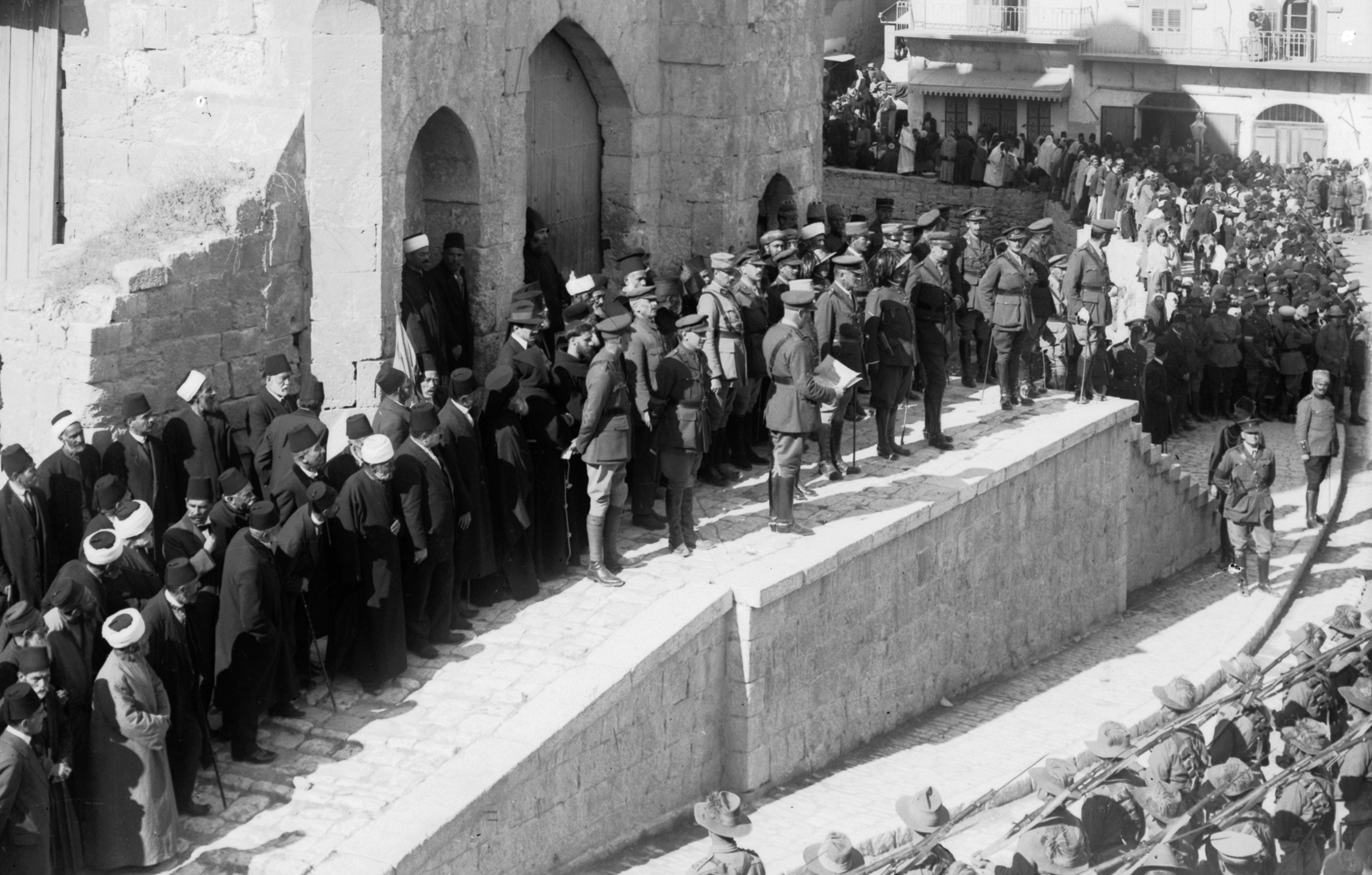
General Edmund Allenby entering Jerusalem during the Sinai and Palestine campaign, 11 December 1917

In 1914, Enver Pasha's alliance with Germany led the Ottoman Empire into World War I on the side of the Central Powers against the Entente, an alliance that included Russia, Great Britain and France. The British saw the Ottomans as the weak link in the Central Powers, and concentrated on knocking them out of the war. When a direct assault failed at Gallipoli in 1915, they turned to fomenting revolution in the Ottoman domains, exploiting the awakening force of Arab, Armenian, and Assyrian nationalism against the Ottomans. The British found an ally in Sharif Hussein, the hereditary ruler of Mecca believed by many Muslims to be a descendant of Muhammad, who led an Arab Revolt against Ottoman rule, after being promised independence.

The Entente won the war and the Ottoman Empire was divided according to the 1920 Treaty of Sevres. Most of its territory was ceded to Britain and France. The Turkish War of Independence led to the creation of the modern Turkish state. The war transformed the region in terms of shattering Ottoman power which was supplanted by increased British and French influence; the creation of the Middle Eastern state system as seen in Turkey, TransJordan (Jordan), Iraq and Saudi Arabia; the emergence of explicitly more nationalist politics, as seen in Turkey and Egypt; and the expansion of oil industry, particularly in the Gulf States.

=== Aftermath of World War I ===
==== Ottoman defeat and partition ====
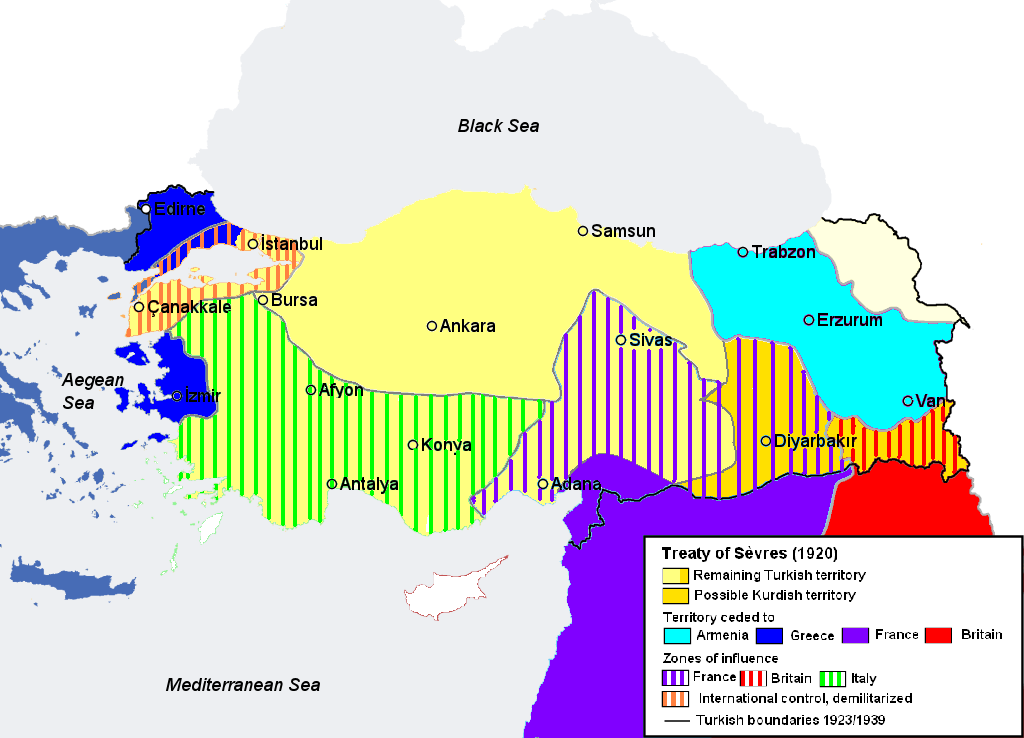
Borders of Turkey according to the Treaty of Sèvres (1920) which was annulled and replaced by the Treaty of Lausanne in 1923

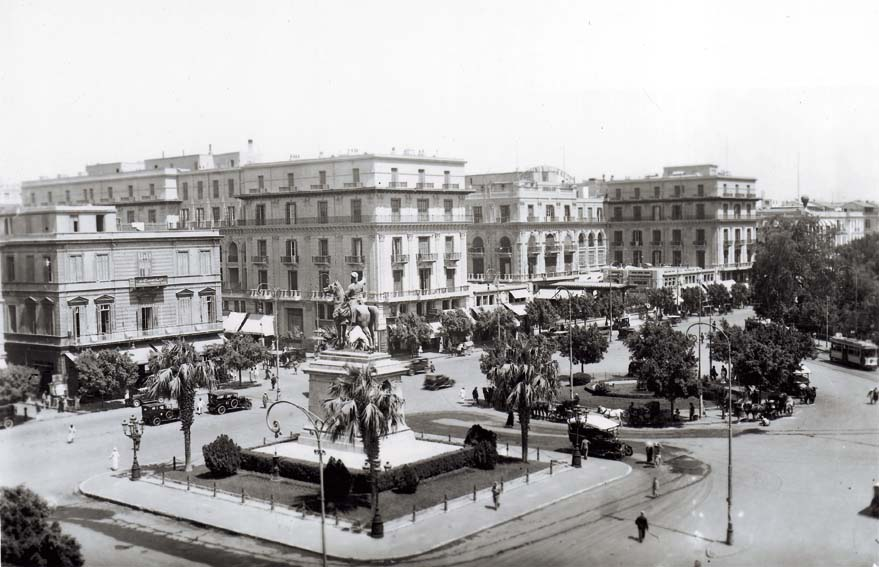
Cairo in 1920

When the Ottoman Empire surrendered to the Allies in 1918, the Arab factions who had fought alongside the Entente did not get what they had expected. The British and French governments had concluded a secret treaty before the armistice, the Sykes–Picot Agreement, partitioning the Middle East amongst themselves. The Lloyd George ministry had in 1917 issued the Balfour Declaration, promising the international Zionist movement their support in re-creating the historic Jewish homeland in Surya al-Janubiyya (Southern Syria).After the Ottomans withdrew, Arab leaders proclaimed an independent state in Damascus, but this was not recognized by France. After a four month-long war, the kingdom surrendered to French forces on 25 July 1920, ending its existence.

Syria became a French protectorate as a League of Nations mandate. The Christian coastal areas were split off to become Lebanon, another French protectorate. Iraq and Surya al-Janubiyya (Southern Syria) became British mandated territories. Iraq became the "Kingdom of Iraq" and one of Sharif Hussein's sons, Faisal, was installed as the King of Iraq. Iraq incorporated large populations of Kurds, Assyrians and Turkmens, many of whom had been promised independent states of their own.

Meanwhile, the fall of the Ottomans and the partitioning of Anatolia by the Allies led to resistance by the Turkish population, under the Turkish National Movement led by Mustafa Kemal Atatürk, the Turkish victory against the invading powers during the Turkish War of Independence, and the founding of the modern Republic of Turkey in 1923. Atatürk, the Republic's first President, embarked on a program of modernisation and secularisation that pushed Turkey both economically and culturally closer to Europe and away from the Arab world. He abolished the caliphate, emancipated women, enforced western dress and the use of a new Turkish alphabet based on Latin script in place of the Arabic alphabet, and abolished the jurisdiction of the Islamic courts.

==== Mandatory Palestine, Transjordan, Saudi Arabia, and Egypt ====
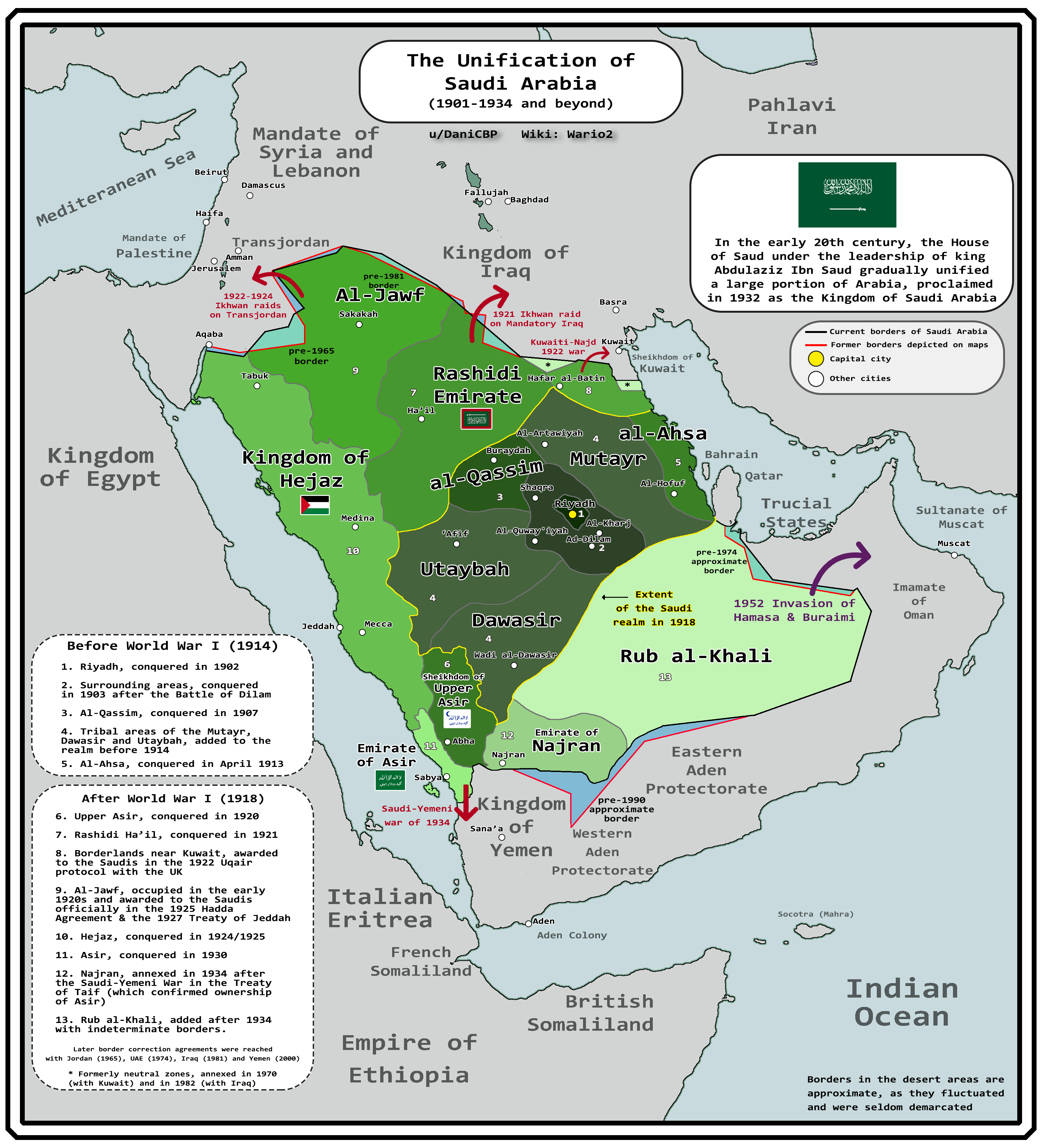
Territorial evolution of the Third Saudi state (1902–1934)

Another turning point came when oil was discovered, first in Persia (1908) and later in Saudi Arabia (1938) as well as the other Persian Gulf states, Libya, and Algeria. The Middle East possessed the world's largest untapped reserves of crude oil, that were also amongst the easiest to extract. Oil is the most important commodity in the 20th century. The discovery of oil in the region made many of the kings and emirs of the Middle East immensely wealthy and enabled them to consolidate their hold on power while giving them a stake in preserving western hegemony over the region.

As the West became dependent on Middle Eastern oil exports and British influence steadily declined, American interest in the region grew. Initially, Western oil companies established dominance over oil production and extraction. However, indigenous movements towards nationalizing oil assets, oil sharing, and the advent of OPEC shifted the balance of power towards the Arab oil states.

Britain was granted a Mandate for Palestine in April 1920 at the San Remo Conference, and, in July 1922, this mandate was approved by the League of Nations. Ottoman Surya al-Janubiyya (Southern Syria) became the British Mandate of Palestine and was placed under direct British administration. The Jewish population of the area, consisting of indigenous Jews and those of recent migrations from Europe, numbered less than 8 percent in 1918, the rest of the population being primarily Muslim and Christian. Jews had been driven from their ancient homeland since the time of the bible. Under the British mandate, Zionist settlers were initially granted wide rein to immigrate, buy land from absentee landlords or others willing to sell, set up a local government and later establish the nucleus of a state, all under British protection. Arab Palestinian discontent with British policies and increasing levels of Jewish immigration led to numerous riots and the 1936–1939 Arab revolt in Palestine, which led Britain to issue the White Paper of 1939 restricting all Jewish immigrants from coming to the Mandate.

The territory east of the Jordan River and west of Iraq was also declared a British Mandate when the Council of the League of Nations passed the British-written Transjordan Memorandum in September 1922. Most of the Arabian peninsula, including Mecca and Medina, though not incorporated into either a British or French colonial mandate, fell under the control of another British ally, Ibn Saud, who in 1932, founded the Kingdom of Saudi Arabia.

In the early 20th century, Syria and Egypt made moves towards independence. In 1919, Egyptian anti-colonial activist Saad Zaghloul orchestrated mass demonstrations in Egypt known as the 1919 Egyptian revolution, in which 800 Egyptians were killed and 1,600 wounded along with 61 European soldiers and civilians; Zaghloul would go on to serve as Prime Minister of Egypt. In 1920, the French defeated Syrian forces in the Battle of Maysalun and the British defeated Iraqi rebels when they revolted. In 1922, the nominally independent Kingdom of Egypt was created following the British government's issuance of the Unilateral Declaration of Egyptian Independence.

=== World War II (1939–1945) ===
In 1939, World War II began when Nazi Germany, led by Adolf Hitler, invaded Poland. It was mainly fought between the Allies (including Britain, the United States and the Soviet Union) against the Axis powers (including Germany, the Kingdom of Italy, and the Empire of Japan). Germany occupied much of Europe. In the Holocaust, Germany murdered millions of people in concentration camps throughout occupied Europe, including six million Jews.

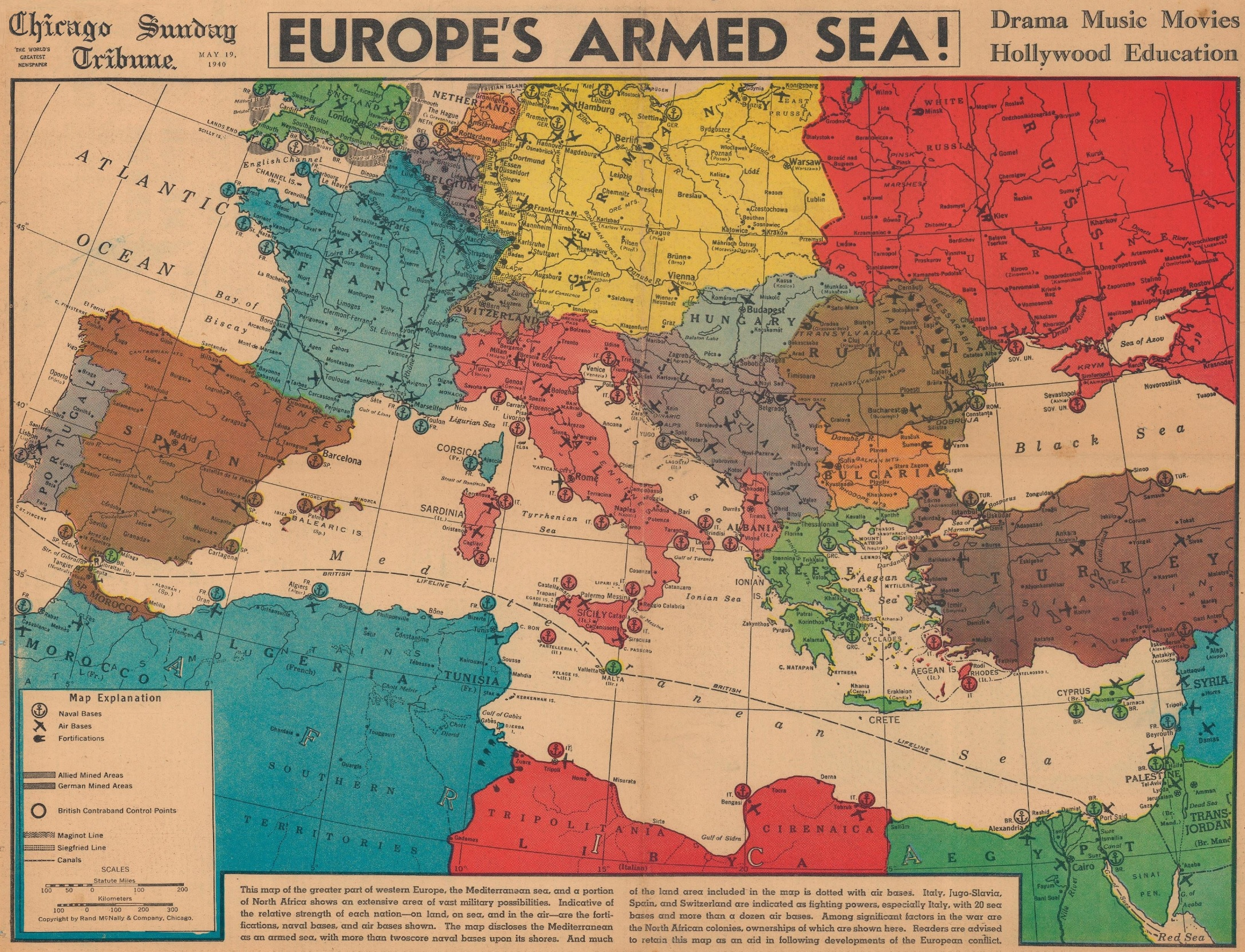
The Mediterranean Sea in May 1940: the British Empire (green) controlled, or was allied with, the Kingdom of Greece, British Cyprus, the Kingdom of Egypt, Mandatory Palestine, and the Emirate of Transjordan, while France (blue) controlled the Syrian Republic (which included Lebanon)

The French Third Republic, an Allied power, was invaded by Germany in May 1940. In June, Germany won and split France into two governments, the northern half of the country under direct German control, and the southern under the semi-autonomous Vichy France, which collaborated with Germany. Syria was put under the administration of Vichy France.

The Middle East was essential to the British Empire, and Germany and Italy worked to undermine British influence there. Hitler allied with the Muslim leader Amin al-Husseini—in exile since he participated in the 1936–1939 Arab revolt in Palestine—as part of promoting Arab nationalism to destabilize regional British control. Mohammad Reza Pahlavi, the Shah of Iran since 1941, tried to keep his country neutral in the presence of Axis agents. The handover of Syria to Vichy France threatened British communication lines between Europe and India, which was a British colony; this was exacerbated by Germany's successful invasion of Greece.

In accordance with the Anglo-Egyptian treaty of 1936, Egypt allowed Britain to operate facilities related to the war effort in Egypt's territory, though most Egyptians favored neutrality or supported the Axis. The British were angered by Hussein Sirri Pasha's neutral stance, and in 1942 as German forces neared Egypt, UK ambassador to Egypt Miles Lampson forced Farouk to replace Pasha with Wafd Party politician Mostafa el-Nahas in the Abdeen Palace incident. The confrontation furthered Farouk's hostility towards the British, and Egypt only declared war on Germany and Japan in 1945.

In Iraq, a pro-British regime headed by the Regent 'Abd al-Ilah and Prime Minister Nuri as-Said ruled the country. Iraq severed relations with Germany on 5 September 1939 following the outbreak of World War II in Europe. However, Nuri tread carefully between his close relationship with Britain and dependence on pro-German Iraqi army officers and cabinet members. In 1941, a coup d'état led by four Iraqi nationalist army generals, known as "the Golden Square", overthrew al-Ilah and as-Said's regime. The Golden Square intended to use the war to press for full Iraqi independence following the limited independence granted by Britain in 1932.

In May 1941, the Anglo-Iraqi War began as the British forces invaded Iraq and defeated the pro-Nazi Iraqi regime. The Golden Square fled the country, and al-Ilah and as-Said were installed as the leaders of Iraq once more. British-led forces also captured Syria and Lebanon from Vichy France to secure their regional control and provide security for their forces in Egypt. Meanwhile, the Allies were worried Germany would try to access Iranian oil reserves, and the Soviets needed new supply routes to other Allied states after Germany invaded the western Soviet Union in Operation Barbarossa. These factors prompted the successful Anglo-Soviet invasion of Iran in August 1941.

When World War II ended, the British, French, and Soviets, withdrew from most parts of the regions they had occupied both before and during the war and seven Middle Eastern states gained or regained independence later on: Lebanon, Syria, Jordan, Iraq, Egypt, Israel, and Cyprus.

=== Establishment of the State of Israel (1948) ===
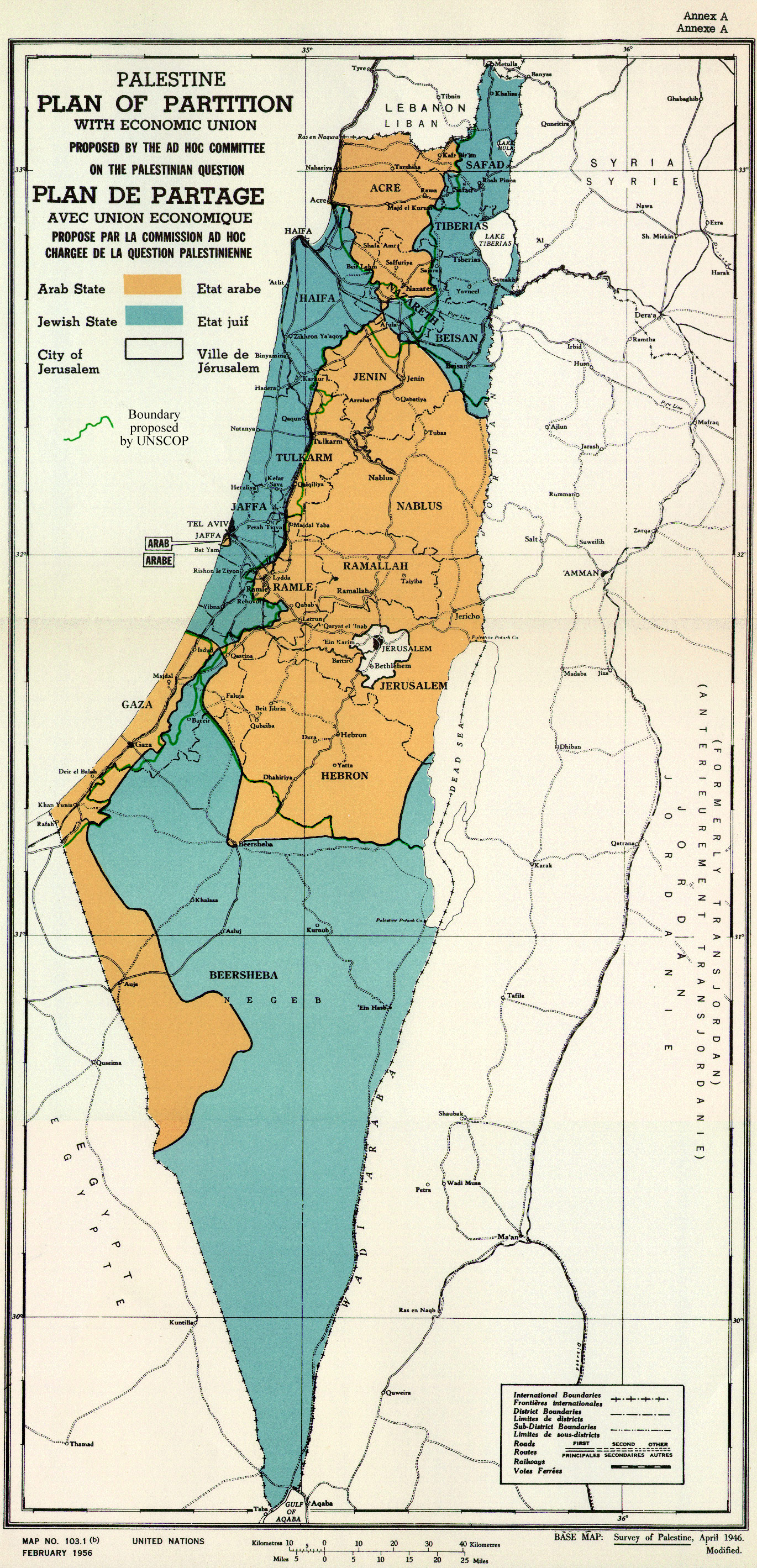
A United Nations map of the 1947 Partition Plan of Palestine; orange is the "Arab State" and blue is the "Jewish State.”

In Palestine, conflicting forces of Arab nationalism and Zionism created a situation the British could neither resolve nor extricate themselves from. The Holocaust created a new urgency in the Zionist quest to immigrate to Palestine and create a Jewish state. A Palestinian state was also an attractive alternative to the Arab and Persian leaders as a means of undermining British and French and perceived Jewish influence in the region under the logic of "the enemy of my enemy is my friend".

The Arab—Jewish struggle culminated in the 1947 United Nations plan to partition Palestine. This plan sought to create an Arab state and a separate Jewish state in the narrow space between the Jordan River and the Mediterranean. Jewish leaders accepted the plan, but Arab leaders rejected it.

In May 1948, when the British Mandate expired, the Zionist leadership declared the State of Israel. In the 1948 Arab–Israeli War which immediately followed, the armies of Egypt, Syria, Transjordan, Lebanon, Iraq, and Saudi Arabia intervened and were defeated by Israel. About 800,000 Palestinians fled from areas annexed by Israel and became refugees in neighbouring countries, thus creating the "Palestinian problem", which has troubled the region ever since. Approximately two-thirds of 758,000–866,000 of the Jews expelled or who fled from Arab lands after 1948 were absorbed and naturalized by the State of Israel.

=== 1952 Egyptian revolution ===
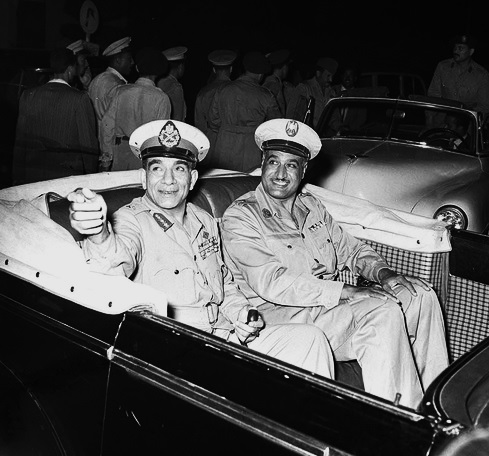
The leaders of the 1952 Egyptian revolution, Mohamed Naguib (left) and Gamal Abdel Nasser (right), pictured in 1954

In Egypt, civil conflict between left- and right-wing radicals, and Egyptian opposition to the continued British occupation of the Suez Canal, led to the 1952 Egyptian revolution. In July 1952, Farouk was overthrown in a coup by the Free Officers, a group of Egyptian nationalist military officers led by Major General Mohamed Naguib and General Gamal Abdel Nasser.

The Egyptian monarchy was dissolved, and in June 1953, Egypt became a republic. A council of eleven military officers led by Nasser, the Egyptian Revolutionary Command Council, governed the country with "carefully controlled manipulation" of the populace. Political parties were banned. Naguib was made Egypt's president, but was effectively a puppet ruler, answering to the council. However, his position threatened Nasser's influence, so in 1954, Nasser mobilized a coalition of supporters (including the working class, the Muslim Brotherhood, police officers, and members of the former political parties) and overthrew Naguib, placing him under house arrest. Nasser was made prime minister.

Britannica writes that in Nasser's 1954 book Philosophy of the Revolution, he "outlined his aspiration to be the leader of the 55 million Arabs, then of the 224 million Africans, then of the 420 million followers of Islam". He initially had a moderate diplomatic approach with Israel, Britain and the Sudanese people in southern Egypt, the last of whom wanted independence. In 1953, Egypt agreed to a Sudanese provisional self-government, and Sudan became an independent republic in 1956.

=== 1953 Iranian coup d'état ===
After World War II, Britain continued to maintain a presence in Iran, effectively controlling Iran's oil industry through the Anglo-Persian Oil Company. In 1951, Mohammad Mosaddegh became Iran's prime minister, and his democratic and nationalist government took control of the Iranian parliament. The parliament voted to nationalize Iran's oil industry, leading the UK's MI6 to "secret[ly] campaign to weaken and destabilize Mosaddegh". The Shah, influenced by the MI6 campaign, attempted to oust Mosaddegh from the Iranian government with a parliamentary decree. This failed and only strengthened Mosaddegh, while weakening the Shah. The British government then used anti-communist rhetoric to persuade the U.S.—now in the Cold War against the Soviets—to cooperate in overthrowing Mosaddegh.

In the 1953 Iranian coup d'état, the Central Intelligence Agency (CIA) and MI6 funded agents in Iran who were "used to foment unrest" against Mosaddegh through "harassment of religious and political leaders and a media disinformation campaign". In August 1953, Mosaddegh was overthrown after deadly fighting in Tehran, and the CIA sanctioned the Shah becoming the singular leader of Iran. Mosaddegh was put under house arrest until his death. The coup and its effects created the conditions for the 1979 Iranian revolution.

=== Suez Crisis (1956) ===
An American newsreel for 12 November 1956, reporting on the end of the Suez Crisis

The Suez Crisis in 1956 originated in Egypt's growing support for Czechoslovakia and the Soviet Union, communist allies. In response, the U.S. and U.K. decided not to finance Egypt's construction of the Aswan Dam across the Nile. This provoked Nasser into nationalizing the Suez Canal in July 1956, seizing the British and French Suez Company. The U.K. and France, thinking that Nasser might close off the canal—thus cutting off petroleum shipments to Europe—began a military response against Egypt. In October, Israel joined the conflict, advancing towards the canal. This interfered with the British and French plan, and they forced Israel to stand down. In November, the two countries occupied the canal; the U.S., disapproving of this, led a campaign in the United Nations (UN) to force the British and French out of the canal. Egypt ultimately won control over the canal, and the U.K. and France lost much influence in the Middle East.

=== Modern Middle East ===
1963 film about contemporary events in the Middle East

The modern Middle East was shaped by three things: departure of European powers, the founding of Israel, and the growing importance of the oil industry. These developments eventually led to increased U.S. involvement in the region. The U.S. was the ultimate guarantor of the region's stability as well as the dominant force in the oil industry after the 1950s. When revolutions brought radical anti-Western regimes to power in Egypt (1954), Syria (1963), Iraq (1968), and Libya (1969), the Soviet Union, seeking to open a new arena of the Cold War, allied itself with Arab socialist rulers.

In the mid-to-late 1960s, the Arab Socialist Ba'ath Party led by Michel Aflaq and Salah al-Din al-Bitar took power in both Iraq and Syria. Iraq was first ruled by Ahmed Hassan al-Bakr, but was succeeded by Saddam Hussein in 1979. Syria was ruled first by a Military Committee led by Salah Jadid, and later Hafez al-Assad until 2000, when he was succeeded by his son, Bashar al-Assad.

=== Cyprus independence and conflict (1960–present) ===
In 1960, Cyprus gained independence from British rule. Archbishop Makarios III, a charismatic religious and political leader, was elected its first independent president, and in 1961 it became the 99th member of the United Nations. Between 1955 and 1974, conflict arising between Greek Cypriots and Turkish Cypriots led to Cypriot intercommunal violence and the Turkish invasion of Cyprus. The Cyprus dispute remains unresolved.

=== Six-Day War (1967) ===
Tensions between Israel and its Arab neighbors rose in 1966 and 1967, as Palestinian guerrilla rebels and the Israel Defense Forces (IDF) attacked each other in bursts. In 1967, Soviet intelligence released a report falsely claiming that Israel was going to start an offensive against Syria, which prompted Gamal Abdel Nasser to mobilize his forces in solidarity with Syria and prepare for war. In the Six-Day War in June, Israel invaded and seized the Sinai Peninsula and Gaza from Egypt; the West Bank, including East Jerusalem, from Jordan; and the Golan Heights from Syria. The war ended with Israel's continued control of the territories when all countries involved agreed to a ceasefire.

Israeli and Egyptian territorial changes in the Six-Day War and Yom Kippur War

The Arab countries had 18,000 casualties in the war, while Israel had 700. In November 1967, UN Resolution 242 called for Israel to return the stolen territories, which the country did not do. One million Palestinians now lived under Israeli occupation. With an overwhelming Israeli victory, many viewed the defeat as the failure of Arab socialism. Militant and fundamentalist Islam filled the "political vacuum" that was made.

=== War of Attrition (1967–1970) ===
In 1968, Nasser announced his plans to take back the Sinai Peninsula, receiving aid from the Soviets to make up for Egyptian losses in the war. The War of Attrition started with limited fighting. The war paused with a mutual ceasefire as both countries built up their forces. In 1969, a larger-scale war began, minorly involving Iraq, Jordan, Palestine, and Syria in an eastern front. In 1970, Nasser asked for direct military support from the Soviets, who began air strikes on Israelis in Egypt. This led to the U.S. mediating another ceasefire, ending the war with no territorial changes.

=== Yom Kippur War, the PLO, and the Camp David Accords (1973–1979) ===
After the War of Attrition, new Egyptian president Anwar Sadat said he would make peace negotiations with Israel if they accepted the terms of UN Resolution 242. Israel denied the deal, leading to the Yom Kippur War. In October 1973, Egypt and Syria invaded the Sinai Peninsula and Golan Heights to take them back. The U.S. sided with Israel, and the Soviet Union with Egypt and Syria. In 1974, the three warring states agreed to ceasefires and the construction of a UN buffer zone between Egypt and Syria. The Sinai Peninsula stayed under Israeli occupation.

In 1964, the Palestinian Liberation Organization (PLO) was created as an umbrella organization for underground anti-Israel Palestinian rebels. They grew in the post-1967 occupation, and in 1969, Yasser Arafat was made their chairman. PLO's many factions have different ideologies, from wanting to destroy the state of Israel and replace it with a religiously equal state, or negotiating with Israel for peace. In the 1970s, some PLO factions engaged in guerrilla warfare against Israel and elsewhere from the PLO's headquarters in Jordan, before Jordan forced them out in 1971. The PLO moved to Lebanon. In 1974, Arafat ordered the end of attacks outside of Israel, and Arab states recognized the PLO as the legitimate Palestinian governmental body.

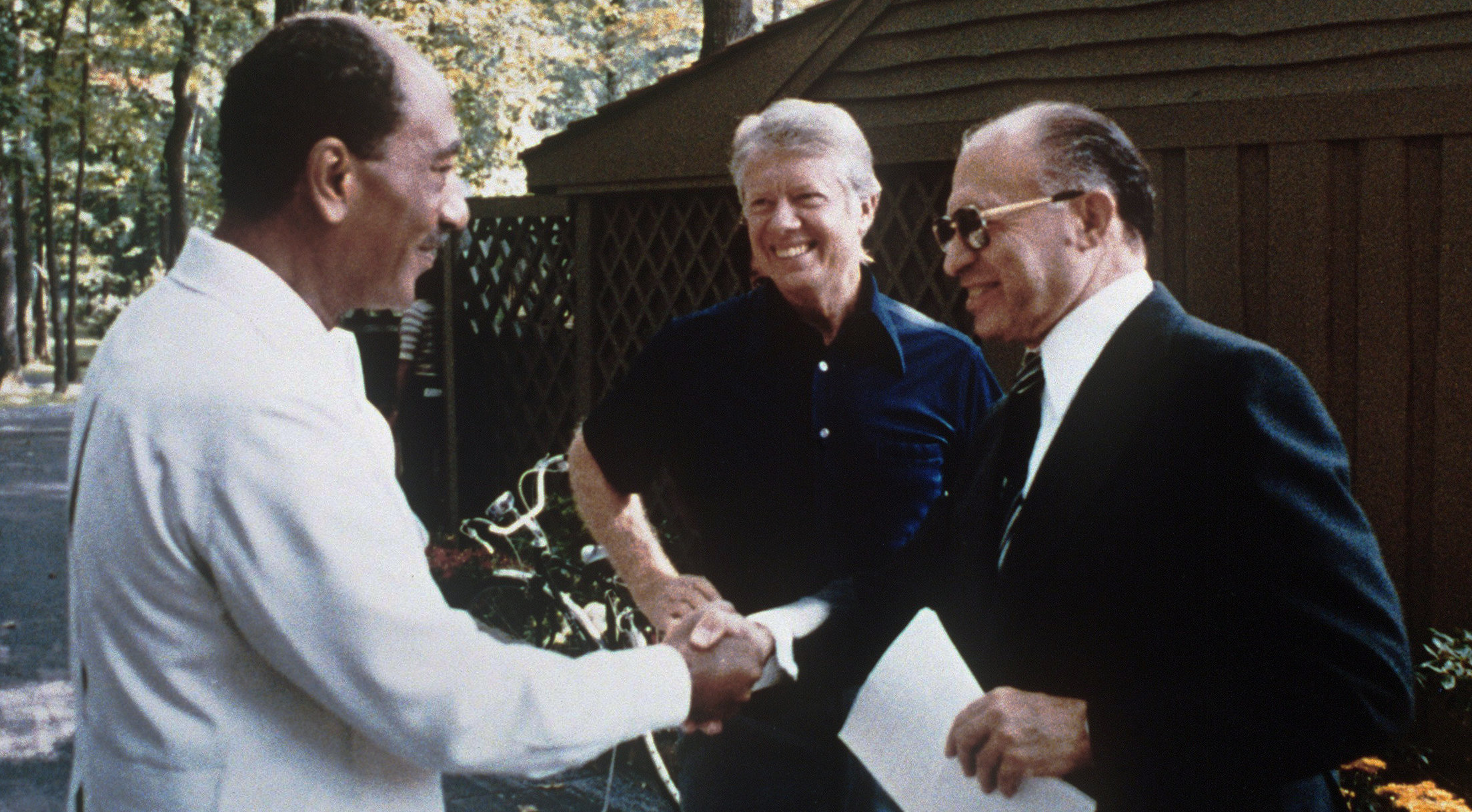
U.S. president Jimmy Carter, Israeli prime minister Menachem Begin, and Egyptian president Anwar Sadat at the 1978 Camp David Accords

The 1978 Camp David Accords mediated by the U.S. led to the 1979 Egypt—Israel peace treaty, in which Israel agreed to stop occupying the Sinai Peninsula. Egypt unsuccessfully tried to get Israel to recognize a Palestinian state which governed Gaza and the West Bank; Israel still sought to destroy the PLO. The accords' "Framework for Peace in the Middle East" put off peace between Israel and Palestine for a later time.

=== White Revolution and the Iranian Revolution (1963–1979) ===
From 1963 to 1979, the Shah reformed Iran in the White Revolution. A Western ally, he rapidly urbanized, secularized, and Westernized the country, while forgoing democracy and human rights. Women received more liberties, land was redistributed to families, literacy increased, tribal groups were given greater autonomy, and the economy boomed from oil. Contrarily, political opposition was marginalized and censored, and dissidents were surveilled, harassed, or tortured. Ulama Shia scholars were undermined by secular leaders, and the economic changes did not reach everyone equally.

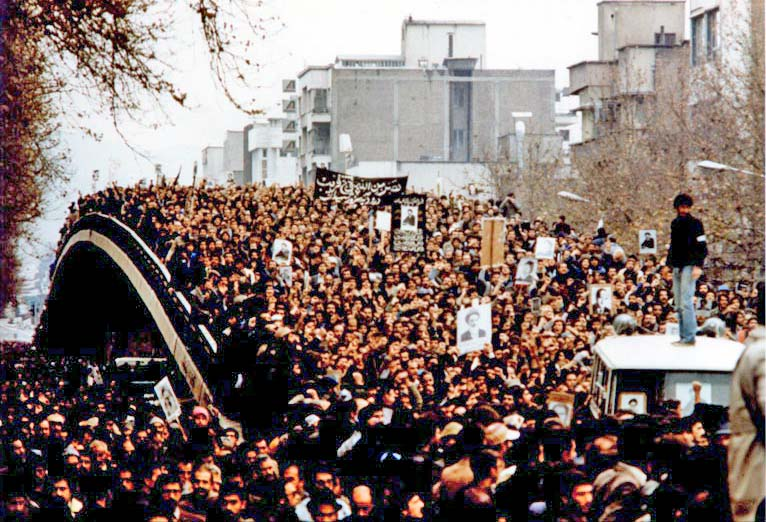
Shi'ite protests against the Pahlavi dynasty during the Iranian Revolution

Shi'ite leaders disliked secularization and women's rights—one leader was the populist and anti-Western Ruhollah Khomeini, who was exiled from Iran in 1964 by the Shah. However, he still had influence there, and called for the Shah's overthrow. During the 1979 Iranian revolution, the Pahlavi dynasty was overthrown. The Shah died from health issues in Egypt, and Khomeini became the country's leader. He made Iran a Shi'ite theocratic state, cut ties with the West, and rolled back women's rights. He stayed in power until 1989.

Shi'ite militants held 66 Americans hostage in the U.S. embassy in Tehran from 1979 to 1981. The hostage takers wanted the U.S. to extradite the Shah to Iran to be put on trial for human rights abuses. The U.S. did not comply, and stopped buying Iranian oil, which hurt the U.S. economy. The Shah's death did not end the crisis, and U.S. president Jimmy Carter lost the 1980 presidential election amidst an oil-related recession. In 1981, when Carter's successor Ronald Reagan took office, the hostages were freed.

=== Lebanese Civil War (1975–1990) ===
The PLO's move to Lebanon, and Israel's wish to destroy the PLO, partially led to the Lebanese Civil War, which was fought from 1975 to 1990. Fighting was between the Lebanese Army; Israel; Syria; the PLO; the Lebanese Front, representing the country's traditional Christian elites; the Lebanese National Movement of leftists, Arab nationalists, and Sunnis; and the Amal Movement of Shi'ite populists. The war ultimately led to Israel and Syria occupying different parts of Lebanon until 2000 and 2005, respectively.

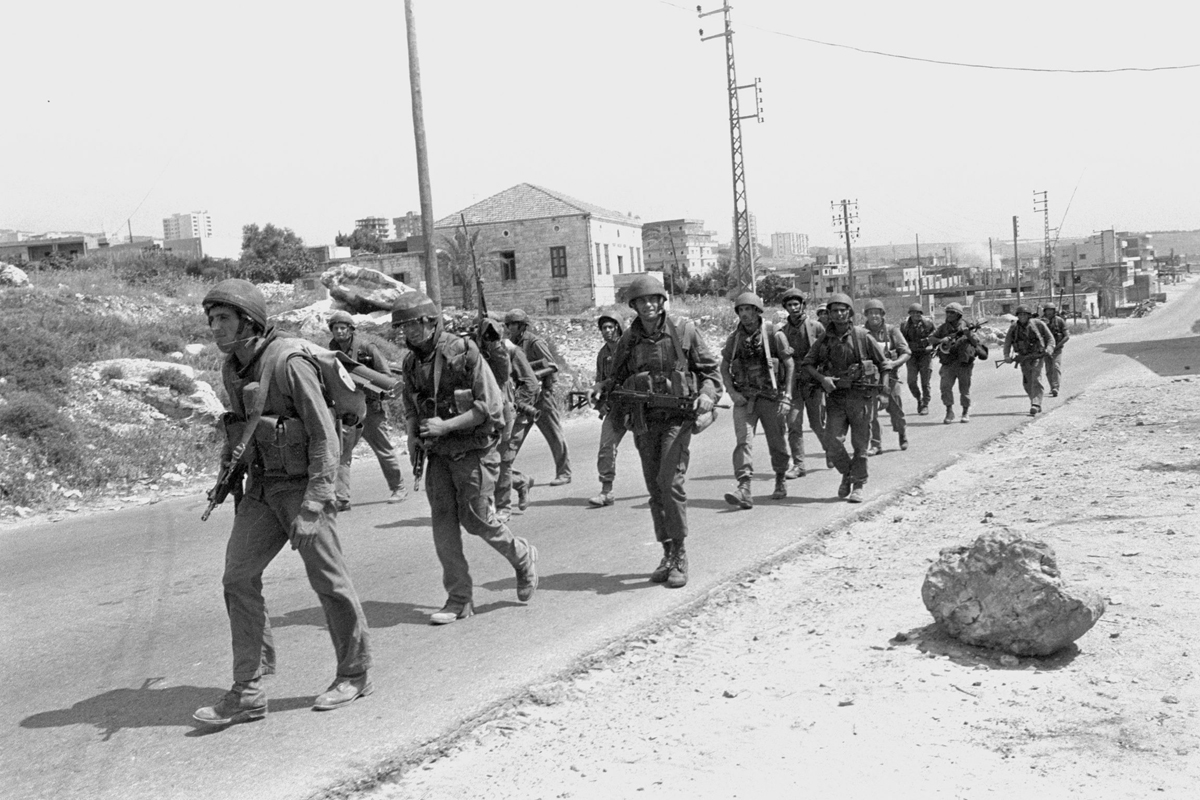
Israeli troops invading Lebanon in 1982

During the 1982 Lebanon War, Israel invaded Lebanon, seven years into the civil War. The invasion was ostensibly because of attacks launched on Israel by PLO members located in Southern Lebanon. Israel reached as far as west Beirut, where the PLO had its main stronghold, putting that part of the city under siege. 19,000 people died under the siege. Those PLO members made an agreement with Israel to leave Lebanon for Tunisia, while Israel occupied Southern Lebanon until 2000, supporting proxy wars there.

In 1982, Lebanese president-elect Bachir Gemayel was assassinated by a Syrian nationalist potentially under orders from Hafez al-Assad. Soon after, the Kataeb Party right-wing Lebanese militia, coordinating with the IDF, carried out the Sabra and Shatila massacre of 2,000 to 3,500 Lebanese and Palestinian civilians. Out of this conflict came Hezbollah, a Lebanese Shi'ite political party and militant organization opposed to Israel, the U.S., and Saudi Arabia, and supported by Iran. In 1983, a terrorist attack by the Islamic Jihad Organization on an American military barrack in Beirut killed 300 American and French soldiers.

=== Iran–Iraq War (1980–1988) ===
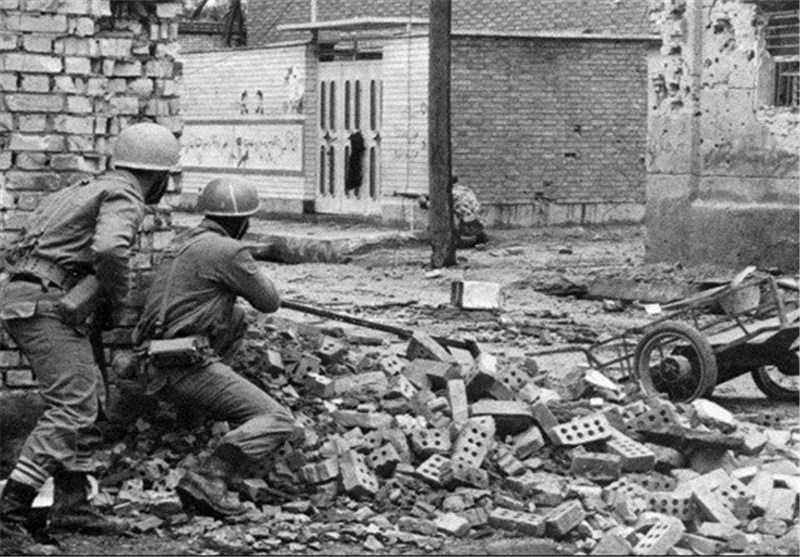
Iranians resisting the Iraqi invasion during the First Battle of Khorramshahr in 1980

Saddam Hussein became the president of Iraq in 1979. The Shi'ite revolution in Iran concerned Hussein, who thought that majority-Shi'ite Iraq would face a similar uprising. He also wanted to overturn the 1975 Algiers Agreement, which let Iran control the Shatt al-Arab waterway in exchange for Iran withdrawing support for an insurgency by northern Iraqi Kurds. The Shatt al-Arab had been Iraq's only way to access the Persian Gulf. Hussein had begun relying on Iraq's minority Sunni population when in 1980, Iraq invaded Iran, starting the Iran—Iraq War. Hussein considered this militarily viable because Iran's military was considered to be weakened after the revolution. Iraq first captured the oil-producing region of Khuzestan, but Iranians intensely resisted, and by 1982, all the Iranian territory that Iraq had taken was reclaimed. Nevertheless, the war continued for another six years at great cost for both sides.

=== Assassination of Anwar Sadat (1981) ===
In 1981, on the anniversary of the Yom Kippur War, Anwar Sadat was assassinated by a group of Islamic extremists while he was inspecting troops in Cairo. They disliked that Sadat negotiated with Israel and let the Shah die in Egypt instead of extraditing him to Iran. The perpetrators were led by Khaled el Islambouli, who had connections to the terrorist group Takfir Wal-Hajira. Takfir Wal-Hajira was partially funded by Libyan leader Muammar Gaddafi, who unsuccessfully attempted to assassinate Sadat in 1980. Sadat was succeeded by his vice president Hosni Mubarak, who put hundreds of people on trial for conspiracy in the assassination. In the following years, Mubarak continued following the terms of the Camp David Accords, and improved relations with other Arab states, Israel, and the U.S.

=== Iran–Contra affair (1985–1987) ===
In the 1980s, the U.S. supported the Contras—fighting the Marxist Nicaraguan government—financially and militarily, as Ronald Reagan feared Marxism spreading through Central America. Supporting the Contras was soon banned by the U.S. Congress. Meanwhile, Americans in Lebanon were being held captive by Shi'ites supporting Iran; the U.S. publicly denied negotiating with terrorists or aiding Iran during its war with Iraq, labeling Iran a terrorist state. Secretly, starting in 1985, Reagan sold Iran weapons in exchange for the hostages' release, diverting some sales revenue to the Contras. This was publicized in 1986, but Reagan was not punished for the illegal act.

=== First Intifada (1987–1993) ===
In 1977, the right-wing political party Likud won the Israeli elections, leading to Israel expropriating more land and furthering settlements in the West Bank. Palestinian protests following the invasion of Lebanon increased Israel's repression in Gaza and the West Bank. The conditions for a Palestinian uprising were greater as certain Palestinians challenged the PLO's leadership and viewed Israel, which in the mid-1980s had a significant number vying for peace, as more receptive to Palestinian protests.

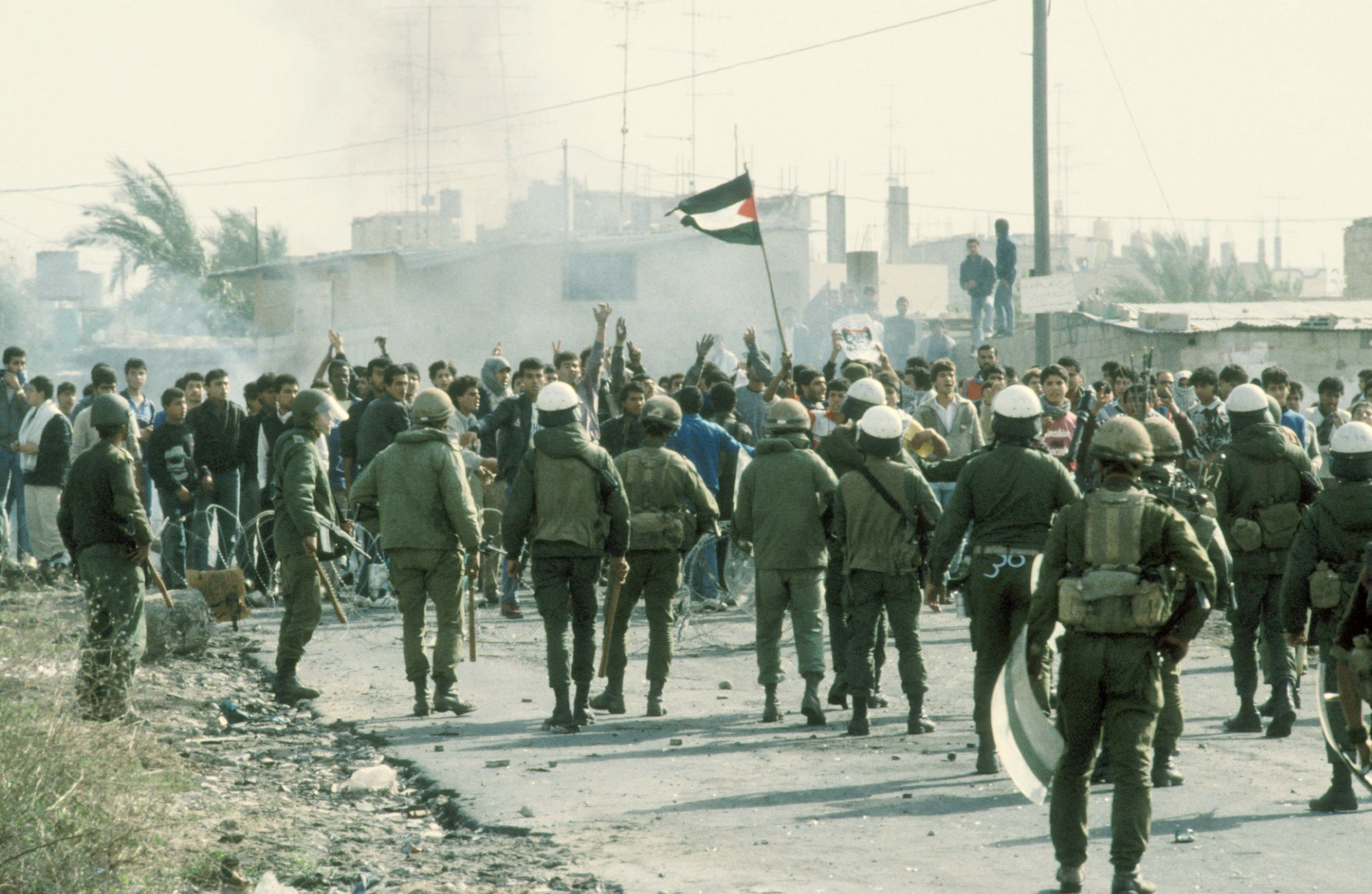
A protest in Gaza during the First Intifada in 1987

In 1987, an Israeli caused a vehicle crash that killed four Palestinians, as revenge for the fatal stabbing of an Israeli in Gaza years prior. The crash led to the First Intifada, a Palestinian uprising—involving the PLO—against Israel. It started as protests and turned into a military conflict against the occupiers. 2,000 people died, around three quarters being Palestinian deaths. In 1988, the PLO denied the U.S.' deal of making peace with Israel on the condition that the PLO acknowledge "Israel's right 'to live in peace within secure and recognized boundaries'". The Intifada politically and economically hurt Israel, who elected politicians favoring peace in the 1992 elections.

=== Dissolution of the Soviet Union (1991) ===
The fall of the Soviet Union and the collapse of communism in the early 1990s had several consequences for the Middle East. It allowed large numbers of Soviet Jews to emigrate from Russia and Ukraine to Israel, further strengthening the Jewish state. It cut off the easiest source of credit, armaments, and diplomatic support to the anti-western Arab regimes, weakening their position. It opened up the prospect of cheap oil from Russia, driving down the price of oil and reducing the west's dependence on oil from the Arab states. It discredited the model of development through authoritarian state socialism, which Egypt, Algeria, Syria, and Iraq had followed since the 1960s, leaving these regimes politically and economically stranded. Rulers such as Saddam Hussein increasingly relied on Arab nationalism as a substitute for socialism.

In most Middle Eastern countries, the growth of market economies was said to be limited by political restrictions, corruption, and cronyism, overspending on arms and prestige projects and over-dependence on oil revenues. The successful economies were countries that had oil wealth and low populations, such as Qatar, Bahrain, Kuwait and the United Arab Emirates (UAE), where the ruling emirs allowed some political and social liberalization, but without giving up any of their own power.

=== Yemeni unification and civil war (1990–1994) ===
The two halves of Yemen which unified in 1990. The gray area, controlled by Saudi Arabia, was ceded to Yemen in 2000.

In 1990, North and South Yemen unified as the Republic of Yemen, whose constitution outlines a liberal parliamentary democracy led by a popularly elected president and a bicameral legislature, one house being popularly elected and the other elected by the president. The first president of the republic was Ali Abdullah Saleh. In the following years, southern Yemenis felt they had a lesser status than the northerners, and tried to split off from the north. Saleh disallowed this, starting the Yemeni civil war of 1994. He ultimately maintained the union. In the 2000 Treaty of Jeddah, Saudi Arabia ceded land to northern Yemen.

=== Gulf War, 1991 Iraqi uprisings, and the 1998 bombing of Iraq ===
In 1990, Iraq—with the world's fifth-largest army—invaded Kuwait in retaliation for oil-related economic disputes between the two countries. The Kuwaitis strongly resisted Iraq, but within days, the capital of Kuwait City was captured. Kuwaiti emir Jaber Al-Ahmad Al-Sabah fled to Saudi Arabia and established a government-in-exile, to which 350,000 Kuwaitis fled. Iraq was supported by Algeria, Jordan, the Palestinian Liberation Organization, Sudan, Tunisia, and Yemen, while Kuwait was supported by Egypt, Saudi Arabia, Syria, and other Gulf states. As Iraqi troops neared Saudi Arabia, Saudi King Fahd asked his allies to respond militarily, which the Soviets supported.

In Operation Desert Storm (movements pictured), an international coalition launched an invasion of Iraq and Iraq-occupied Kuwait

The U.S. launched Operation Desert Shield, deploying more than 400,000 troops and backed by an international coalition. Iraq stopped plans to invade Saudi Arabia. Iraq then established the Republic of Kuwait occupation government led by Colonel Alaa Hussain Ali. The occupiers "began a systematic campaign of pillage, rape, torture, murder, and theft". Hussein used the Kuwaiti crisis to end the Iran—Iraq War, as Iraq accepted Iranian terms and stopped occupying parts of Iran. In 1991, the coalition's Operation Desert Storm started, led by U.S. General Norman Schwarzkopf. It involved air, ground, and naval offenses. Iraq, outnumbered and using ineffective weaponry, was quickly defeated. Iraqi casualties vastly outnumbered the coalition's. Iraq was forced into making peace and recognizing the re-established Kuwaiti emirate's sovereignty.

In the war's aftermath, Kurds in northern Iraq started a rebellion against Hussein's government, which was brutally suppressed. This caused the coalition countries to establish a no-fly zone over parts of Iraq. As part of the war's peace terms, Iraq had to cooperate with UN investigators who would search the country for the presence of weapons of mass destruction (WMDs). Iraq refused to cooperate with the UN, leading to the 1998 bombing of Iraq by the U.S. and U.K.

=== Oslo Accords (1993–1995) ===
The 1993 and 1995 Oslo Accords between Israel and the PLO were initially a significant step towards peace between Israel and Palestine. The accords advocated a two-state solution, and in a slight weakening of Israel's post-1967 occupation of Palestine, Gaza and the West Bank were allowed limited self-governance by the Palestinian Authority. The agreement had the goal of ending the Israel—Palestine conflict by May 1999, but this did not happen. In 1995, Israeli prime minister Yitzhak Rabin was assassinated by a Jewish extremist who was against the accords. This brought up concerns about Israel's national security, which led to the 1996 election of Benjamin Netanyahu, who was against the accords, as prime minister. Netanyahu refused to negotiate with Yasser Arafat. While Netanyahu's successor Ehud Barak resumed negotiations, tensions between Israel and Palestine had once again started to rise.

== 21st century ==
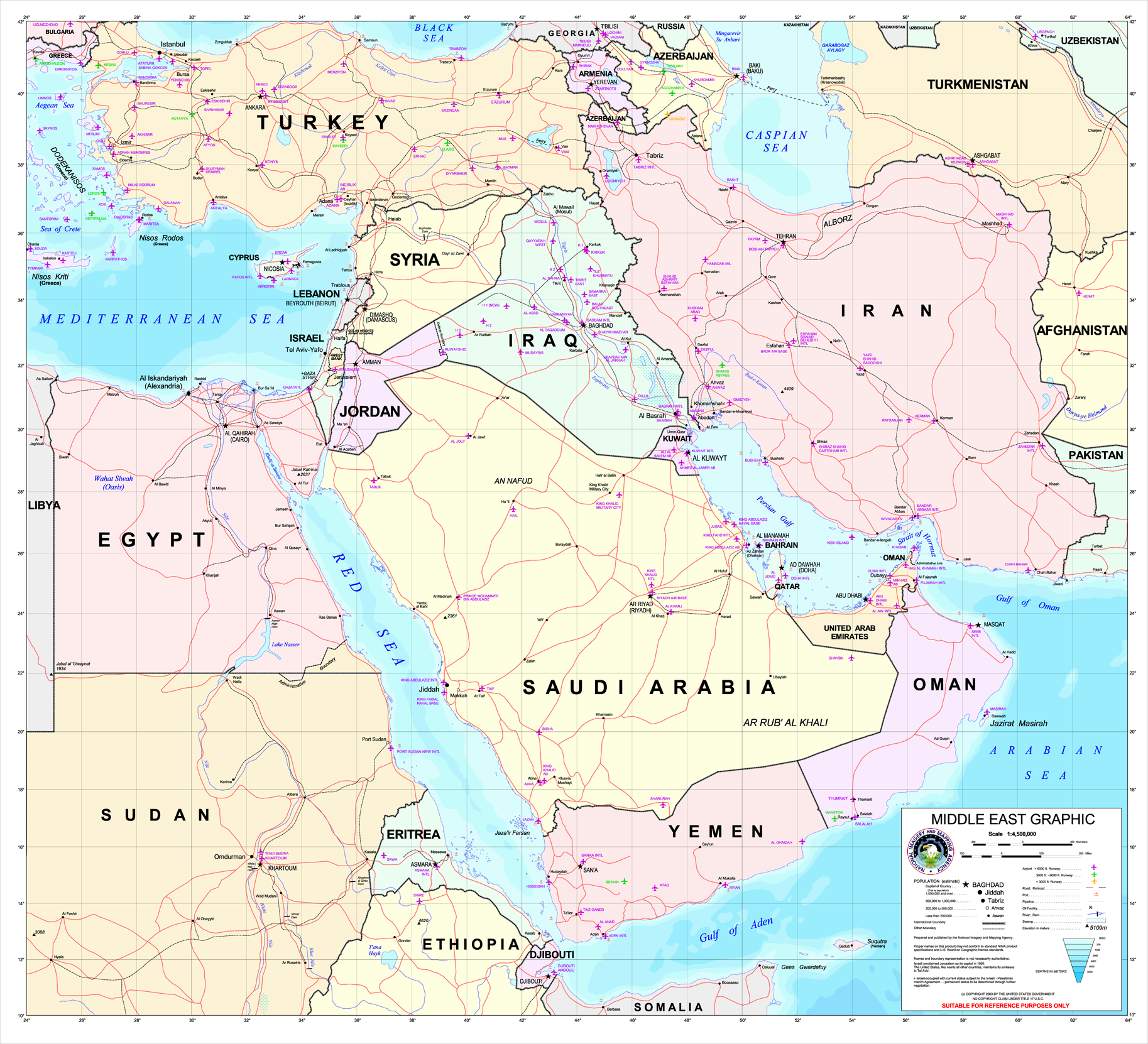
The Middle East in 2003

=== Second Intifada (2000–2005) ===
The 2000 Camp David Summit, meant to further peace between Israel and Palestine, failed. Also that year, Israeli politician Ariel Sharon, leader of Likud, visited the Temple Mount—a holy site for both Jews and Muslims in the Old City of Jerusalem—to promote Israeli sovereignty over the site. Sharon's visit and rioting by Israeli Arabs led to the Second Intifada, an uprising by Palestinians against Israeli security forces in Palestine which lasted until 2005. The Intifada and the failure of the Camp David summit, Britannica writes, "convinced a majority of Israelis that they lacked a partner in [Yasser] Arafat to end the [Israel-Palestine] conflict".

In 2002, at the height of the uprising, Israel began to build a barrier between and Israel and the West Bank, and inside of the West Bank, which Israeli security forces still continued to patrol. 10% of the West Bank's territory effectively became under the control of Israel through the barrier's construction. In 2003, Sharon, then the prime minister of Israel, announced Israeli security forces would withdraw from Gaza and parts of the West Bank. Arafat died in 2004, leading to negotiations between Israel and a more moderate Palestinian government, which led to an agreement for a ceasefire in 2005. In 2005, Israel withdrew its military and settlers from the Gaza Strip, but still patrolled the territory's borders and airspace.

=== Start of the war on terror (2001–2011) ===
In 1988, Osama bin Laden—an Islamist, pan-Islamist, and jihadist of the wealthy bin Laden family which had connections to the Saudi royal family—founded al-Qaeda, a militant terrorist organization. In 1996 and 1998, he declared war on the U.S. in response to their foreign policy in the Middle East, such as their permanent military presence in countries like Saudi Arabia. On 11 September 2001 (9/11), al-Qaeda launched coordinated terrorist attacks targeting various U.S. landmarks, killing almost 3,000 people. U.S. president George W. Bush launched a "war on terror" against terrorist organizations worldwide, including al-Qaeda and their supporters. The U.S. invaded Afghanistan to find bin Laden and dissolve the Taliban government which was harboring al-Qaeda in the country. In 2002, Bush proclaimed that Iraq, Iran, and North Korea constituted an "axis of evil" which supported anti-American terrorism. His administration worked to falsely tie Iraq to 9/11, and claim that Iraq, too, was harboring al-Qaeda. This was while the U.S. maintained relations with Saudi Arabia, who have been more credibly accused of working with the perpetrators of 9/11.

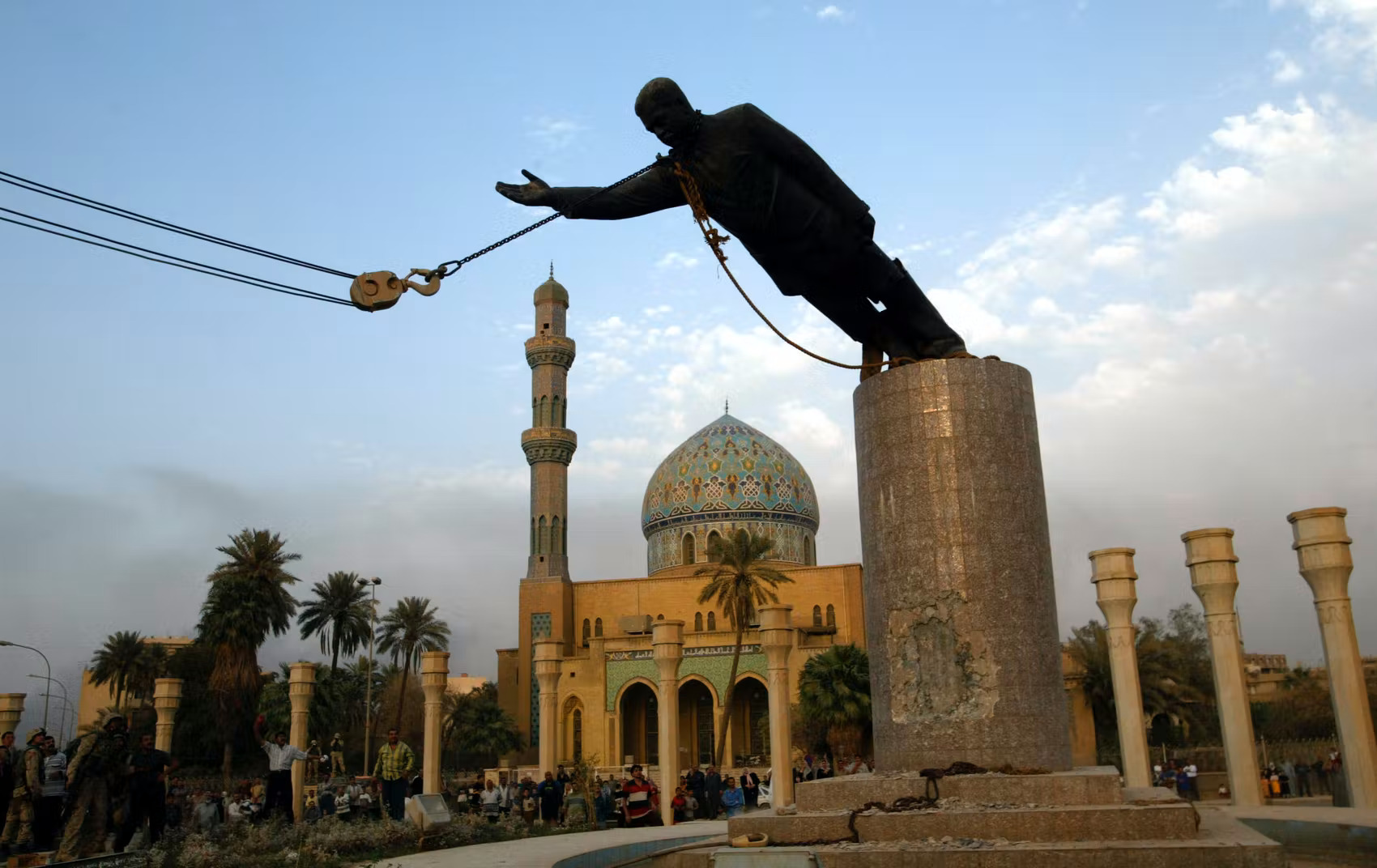
The statue of Saddam Hussein in Baghdad's Firdos Square being taken down during the 2003 invasion of Iraq

In 2002, U.S. Secretary of Defense Donald Rumsfeld developed a plan to invade Iraq, remove Hussein from power, and turn Iraq into a democratic state with a free-market economy, which he hoped would serve as a model for the rest of the Middle East. The U.S. falsely claimed that Iraq was developing and hiding WMDs which could be used to harm the U.S. or other western democracies. British Prime Minister Tony Blair sided with the U.S. In 2003, a U.S.-led international coalition invaded Iraq and toppled Hussein's government. Hussein was captured, put on trial for crimes against humanity in 2005, and was found guilty before being executed in 2006.

When Hussein's government collapsed, Iraq's major cities were subject to widespread looting, and the occupation soldiers came under attack by a new Iraqi insurgency. The insurgency was driven by al-Qaeda, now present in Iraq, under the leadership of Abu Musab al-Zarqawi. The return of formerly-persecuted Shi'a Muslims to the country created a civil war with the Sunnis—who had just lost significant power with the dissolution of the ruling Ba'ath Party, and were radicalized by al-Zarqawi. U.S. troop deaths rose, while they tried to recreate Iraq as a democratic country with free elections. In the U.S. in 2004, it was publicized that U.S. soldiers working at the Iraqi Abu Ghraib prison, which held Iraqi prisoners of war, had engaged in widespread torture and abuse of the inmates; these soldiers were prosecuted by the military, and it had a negative effect on the war's popularity in the U.S. In 2006, al-Zarqawi was killed in a U.S. bombing. In 2007, amidst greater numbers of U.S. deaths in a "grave and deteriorating" war, Bush started a surge of American troops in Iraq; it is debatable if successive U.S. gains in Iraq were due to the troop surge, or other concurrent factors.

=== Further conflict involving Israel, Gaza, and Lebanon (2000–2009) ===
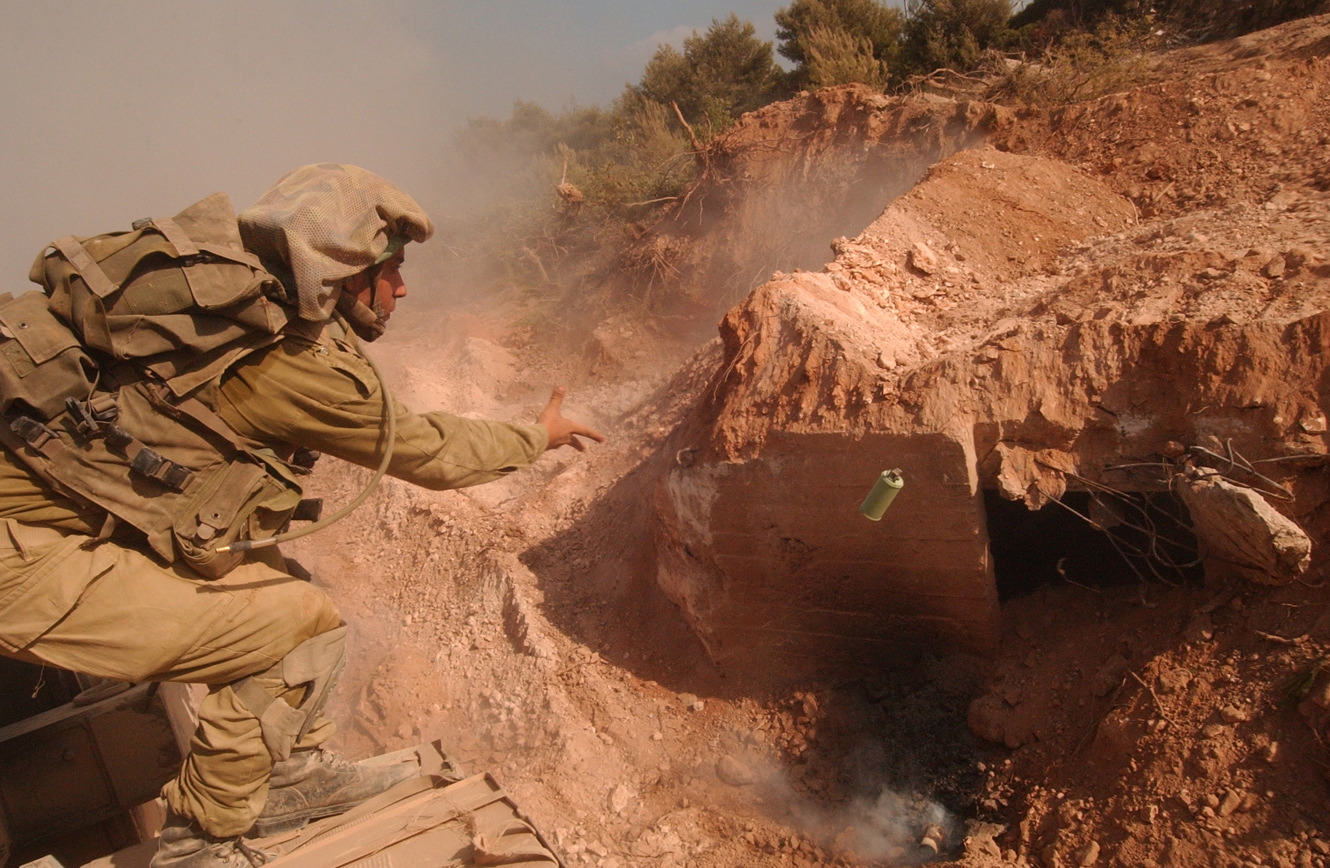
During the 2006 Lebanon War, a soldier of the Israeli Defense Forces tosses a grenade into a bunker occupied by Hezbollah soldiers.

Starting in 2000, Israel and Hezbollah engaged in skirmishes over land disputes and the detention of Lebanese nationals by Israel. In 2006, Hezbollah fired a series of rockets into northern Israel and had ground troops cross the border into Israel, where eight Israeli soldiers were killed and two were kidnapped. This began the 2006 Lebanon War, which lasted until August, when Israel, Lebanon, and Hezbollah agreed to follow UN Resolution 1701.

The Burj Khalifa, the world's tallest building, was completed in Dubai, UAE in 2010

The Palestinian militant organization Hamas won the 2006 Palestinian legislative election. Israel recognized the West Bank's administration as being led by the moderate Fatah, who came in second in the election. Hamas, who only succeeded in governing the Gaza Strip, was declared a hostile group. Israel started a blockade around the Gaza Strip, closing border crossings and limiting imports into the strip. Hamas attacked Israel multiple times, before they made a six-month ceasefire agreement that lasted from June to December 2008. Once the agreement was over, the military conflict restarted with greater intensity, starting the Gaza War of 2008 to 2009. The war ended with another ceasefire agreement, but the blockade by Israel as well as Egypt has continued until the present day.

=== Dubai in the 21st century ===
In the first decades of the 21st century, the Emirati city of Dubai underwent rapid development in previously barren desert land. This included the 2010 opening of the Burj Khalifa, the world's tallest building at 2,717 feet. In 2016, Forbes wrote that Dubai could be "the most important city" of the century, noting that its growth increased the population of the UAE by around 1.3 million in the previous decade.

=== Arab Spring (2010–2012) ===
In the early 2010s, the Arab Spring revolutionary wave created major protests and uprisings against several Middle Eastern and Arab-majority countries' governments. It started in 2010 with the Tunisian revolution, which forced the resignation of president Zine al-Abidine Ben Ali. In 2011, the Egyptian Revolution forced the resignation of president Hosni Mubarak. In Bahrain, protests against the government were violently suppressed. Protests in Syria against Bashar al-Assad were also violently suppressed, leading to the Syrian civil war which has been ongoing since 2011. In Yemen, protests forced the resignation of Ali Abdullah Saleh, who was succeeded by Abdrabbuh Mansur Hadi; Hadi's government was unstable, leading to the Yemeni civil war, which has been ongoing since 2014. In Libya, a civilian uprising against Muammar Gaddaf, led to the 2011 Libyan civil war. U.S.-led NATO forces entered the war on the rebels' side. Gaddafi was killed later that year, and a new national government was formed in 2012. This government was unstable, and Libya became a leaderless state. The region's historical human slave trade returned to Libya, and slave markets were set up in its major cities.

=== Modern Yemeni conflicts (2003–present) ===
In 2003, the Iran-backed Yemeni Houthi movement began an insurgency against Saleh's government—which persecuted Zaydi Shi'ites—as well as Saudi Arabia. In 2009, al-Qaeda in the Arabian Peninsula formed in Yemen, causing Saudi Arabia to secure their border with Yemen. The Yemeni civil war, ongoing since 2014, has been fought between the Republic of Yemen government; the Houthis and their Supreme Political Council government; al-Qaeda; and each faction's allies. In 2014, the Houthis took over the Yemeni capital of Sanaa, and Abdrabbuh Mansur Hadi was put under house arrest. He escaped to Saudi Arabia in 2015. Saudi Arabia and the UAE fought alongside the Republic of Yemen, but the Houthis maintained their holdings. The Houthis captured the city of Aden in 2018, influencing the UAE to withdraw from Yemen.

=== Syrian civil war and the Islamic State (2011–present) ===
2012 was successful for Syrian rebel groups opposing al-Assad, establishing a foothold in Aleppo. The Battle of Aleppo became a stalemate in 2013. The civil war soon became a proxy war, as al-Assad received support from Hezbollah, Iran, and Russia, while rebel groups—starting to have their own infighting—received support from Qatar, Saudi Arabia, Turkey, and the U.S. In 2013, hundreds of civilians in Damascus were killed in a chemical attack by the Syrian government. This caused debate in the U.S., U.K., and France over whether they should militarily intervene in Syria; this was opposed by China, Iran, and Russia. In September, Syria, the U.S., and Russia made an agreement that al-Assad would rid Syria of chemical weapons, which was successfully carried out. Meanwhile, the Al-Nusra Front, an Islamist al-Qaeda affiliate, had military success in Syria.

In 2013, the Islamic State (IS) militant organization began an offensive that captured large swaths of Iraqi and Syrian territory. IS fought those two governments, as well as various anti-Assad rebel groups. In 2014, IS proclaimed themselves a caliphate led by Abu Bakr al-Baghdadi as caliph. They launched many terrorist attacks worldwide. IS' growth overshadowed the successes of the Al-Nusra Front. In 2016, the Al-Nusra Front cut ties with al-Qaeda and soon dissolved, then was succeeded by Tahrir al-Sham in 2017.

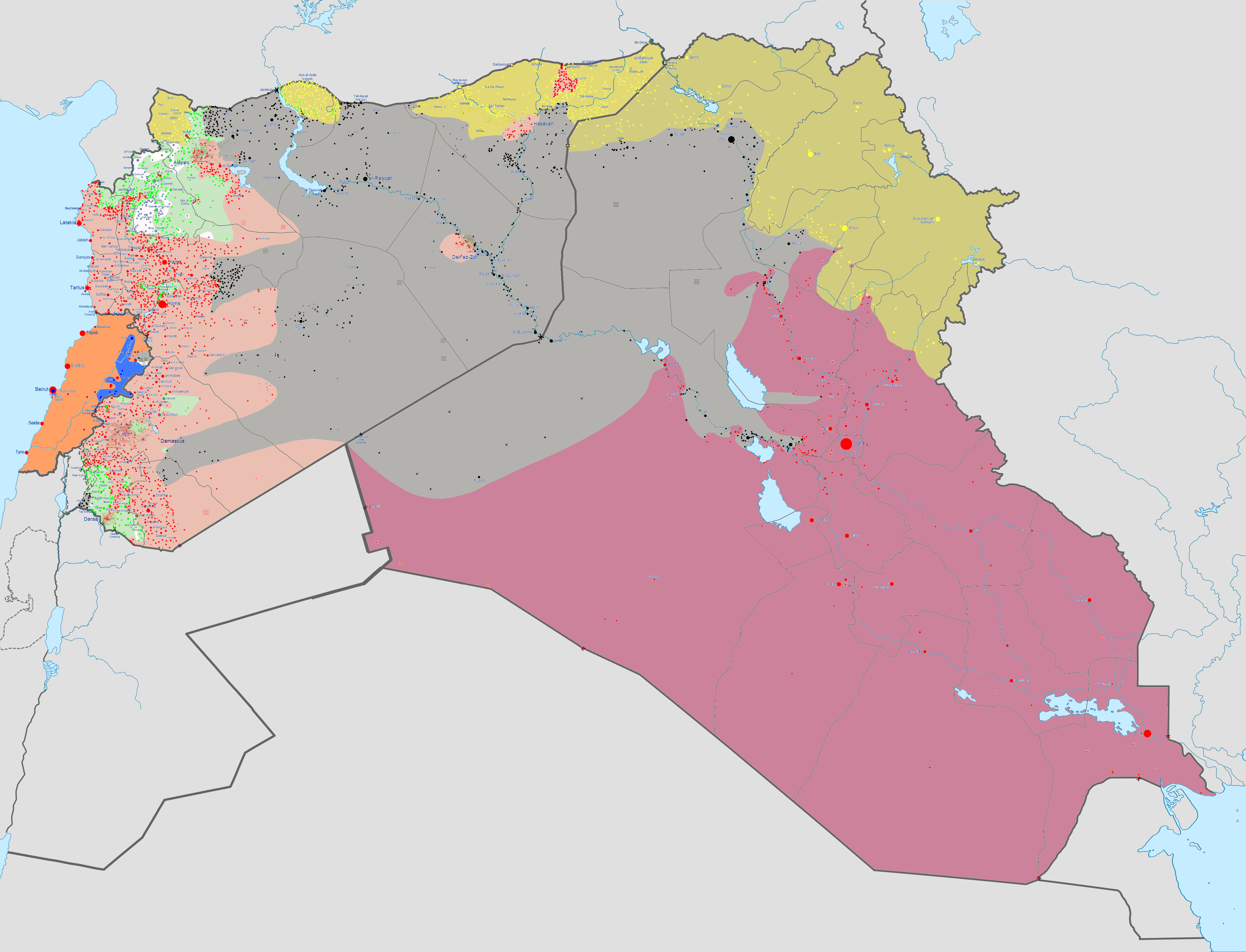
A map of Syria and Iraq in June 2015, showing territories controlled by, among others: Ba'athist Syria (pink), the Islamic State at their greatest extent (gray), Kurdish forces (yellow), and the Republic of Iraq (purple)

There was an international military campaign against IS in Iraq and Syria from 2013 to 2017, which fed into the Syrian civil war. The U.S. and a coalition of Arab countries bombed IS; Russia bombed IS and unrelated Syrian rebel groups, falsely claiming they [Russia] were mostly targeting IS. The U.S. allied with Kurdish-aligned forces such as the Syrian Democratic Forces. Turkey and the Kurds continued their decades-long war with each other, while both were allied with the U.S. and fighting IS. Turkey backed Syrian rebels along the Syria–Turkey border, and the Turkish military directly occupied part of northern Syria in 2016 to fight IS and the Kurds. IS was thus fighting three simultaneous fronts: al-Assad, Kurds, and Turkey, as well as each of their allies.

Outnumbered, IS lost control of three major cities: Aleppo, Raqqa, and Deir al-Zour. The group was "effectively defeated" by 2018. In 2018, Israel targeted Iranian soldiers stationed in Syria. Abu Bakr al-Baghdadi died in Syria in 2019, when he committed suicide amidst an attack on him by U.S. forces. While the original IS organization declined, a branch of IS based in south-central Asia, named Islamic State – Khorasan Province, became more powerful in the 2020s.

=== 2014 Gaza War ===
In 2014, Hamas militants kidnapped and murdered three Israeli teenagers, and two Israelis retaliated by murdering a Palestinian teenager. Large demonstrations by groups in both Israel and Palestine led to exchanges of rocket fire between Israel and Hamas. Israel launched a ground invasion of the Gaza Strip to destroy Hamas' underground tunnel network that was used to store their missiles. Israel successfully destroyed them, limiting Hamas' ability to greatly attack Israel for around a decade, and influencing the two to make a ceasefire agreement.

=== COVID-19 pandemic (2020–present) ===
In 2019, the deadly Coronavirus disease 2019 (COVID-19), which is transmitted by the contagious coronavirus SARS-CoV-2, was first detected in China. In 2020, the disease spread worldwide, the spread being declared a pandemic by the World Health Organization. Jon Alterman writes for the Center for Strategic and International Studies that the Middle East "navigated [COVID-19] better than many initially had feared", as its governments prioritized preventative measures against the disease, such as distributing COVID-19 vaccines. Compared to other regions of the world, Middle Eastern countries generally had lower rates of death (Jordan and Lebanon being exceptions), and less national economies faced massive decline (Lebanon and Syria being exceptions), even for countries economically dependent on tourism.

=== Lebanon liquidity crisis and Beirut explosion (2019–present) ===
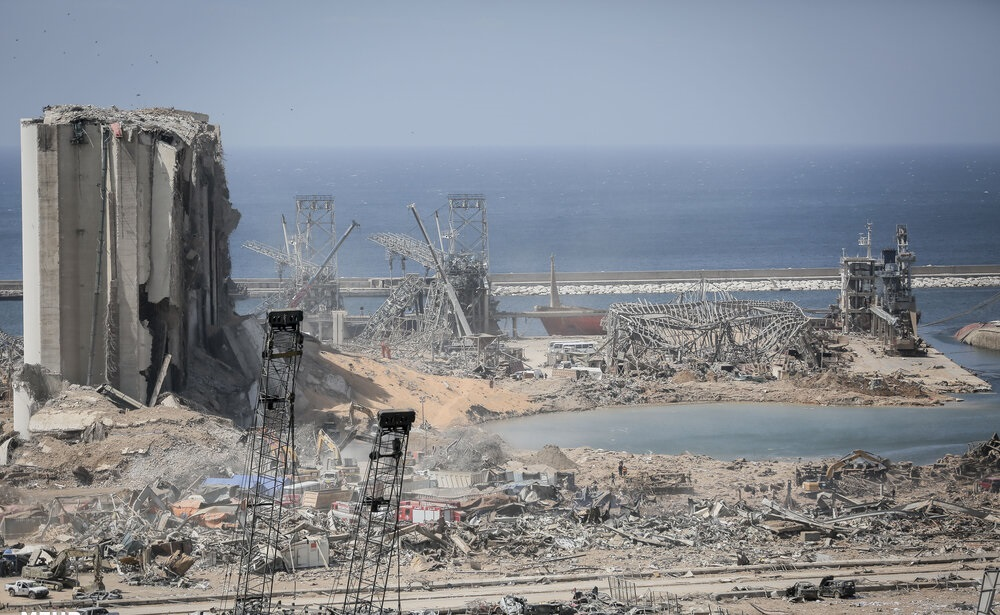
Aftermath of the 2020 Beirut explosion, showing the city's ruined port right by its downtown area

Lebanon was already facing a national economic crisis when the COVID-19 pandemic accelerated their economic decline. This crisis worsened in 2020, when the city of Beirut was heavily damaged in a large explosion; a stockade of ammonium nitrate had been negligently left in the Port of Beirut for years—until the stockade exploded, destroying most of the port and creating a shockwave which damaged much of the city. At least 200 people were killed, 6,000 injured, and 300,000 were made homeless.

=== Israel's conflicts in Palestine, Lebanon, Yemen, and Iran, Middle East crisis (October 2023–present) ===
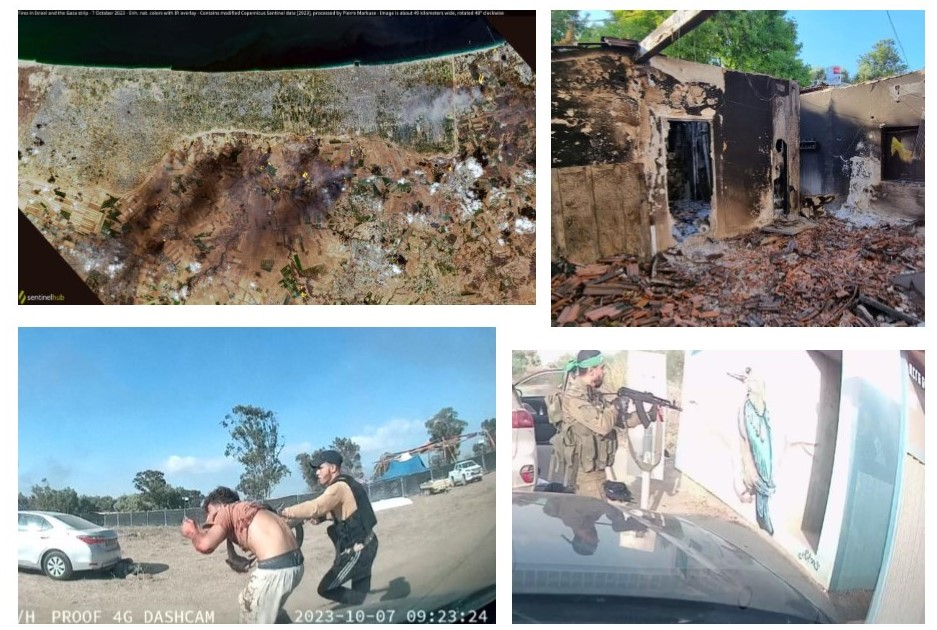
Various pictures of the October 7 attacks on Israel in 2023: a satellite photo of fires throughout Israel, destroyed buildings, and civilians being attacked

In 2022, Benjamin Netanyahu returned as Israeli prime minister, cementing what CNN referred to as "Israel's likely most right-wing government ever". In 2023, Hamas launched a large-scale surprise attack on Israel, killing around 1,200 people, the majority Israeli civilians. Hundreds were taken hostage by Hamas. It was the deadliest day in the history of Israel, which declared war on Hamas. Hezbollah began rocket attacks on Israel, and Israel responded with air strikes. Israel also conducted air strikes on Gaza, followed by a full land invasion. By November 2024, 43,000 Gazans—both civilians and militants—have been killed in the war, and most of the strip has been destroyed.

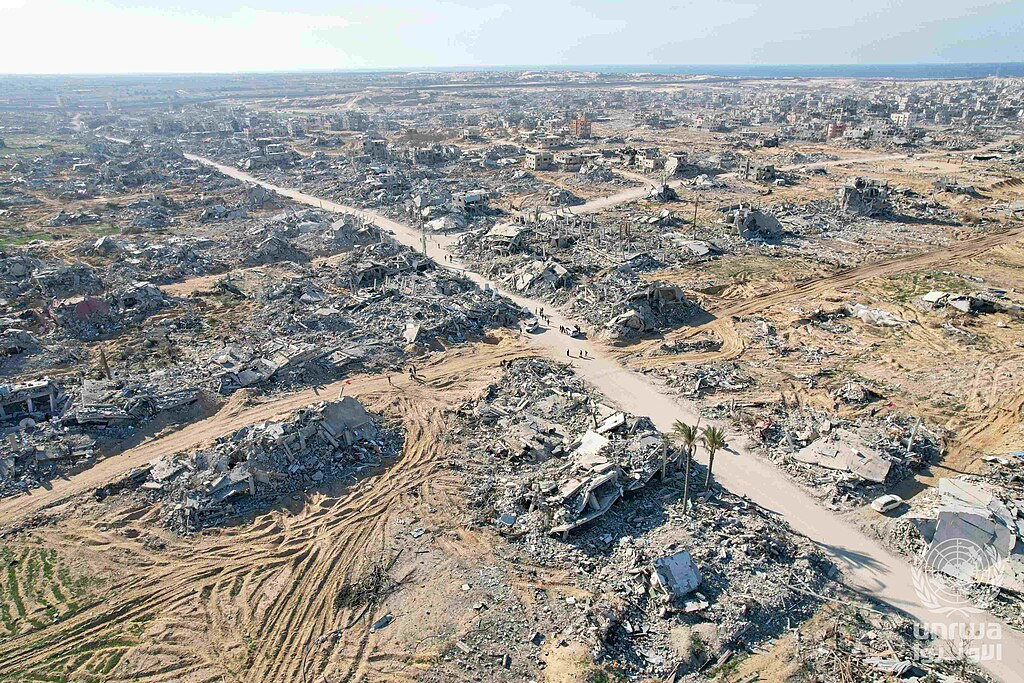
Aerial view showing the destruction of Rafah in the Gaza Strip in January 2025

There were multiple peace talks between Israel, Hamas, and the U.S., but most of these failed. Joe Biden, U.S. president from 2021 to 2025, minorly held back Israel's plans for Gaza, while at the same time supplying Israel with weapons. Many countries and international organizations found Israel to be committing genocide by deliberately shooting, bombing, and starving Gazan civilians en masse. Meanwhile, Iran formed an anti-Israel "axis of resistance" with Hamas, Hezbollah, Syria, and Yemeni Houthis. The Houthis attacked shipping in the Red Sea in 2023, leading to a U.S.-led military response.

In 2024, Iran and Israel launched air strikes at each other. Israeli intelligence then carried out a widespread attack in Lebanon, by flooding the country with electronic devices such as pagers which had been rigged to explode. The devices were intended to be sold to Hezbollah members, though some civilians were killed. Israel then invaded Lebanon, escalating their conflict with Hezbollah.

In 2025, the Houthis made a ceasefire with the U.S., pausing their fighting in Yemen and Houthi attacks on shipping in the Red Sea; the deal did not include an end to the Houthis' attacks on Israel. Later, Israel launched a series of airstrikes on Iran, beginning the Iran-Israel war. Iran responded with strikes against Israel, and the two countries have continued bombing each other since. Israel claimed their strikes were intended to destroy Iran's ambitions to build nuclear bombs for themselves; however, Iranian civilians were targeted in some cases. Israel then strengthened its occupation of the West Bank. In his second term as U.S. president, Donald Trump brought the U.S. into the war on Israel's side, by striking three Iranian nuclear sites. As a result, the Houthis ended their ceasefire with the U.S., and Iran unsuccessfully tried striking a U.S. military base in Qatar.

=== Dissolution of Ba'athist Syria (2024) ===
In 2024, a coalition of Syrian opposition armies captured Damascus, forcing Bashar al-Assad to flee the country—likely to Russia—ending Ba'athist Syria. Since 2022, al-Assad had received less support from Russia, which was "bogged down" in the Russian invasion of Ukraine. Ahmed al-Sharaa, the head of Tahrir al-Sham since 2017, became president of Syria's new national government in 2025.

== See also ==
- Timeline of Middle Eastern history
- Genetic history of the Middle East
- List of modern conflicts in the Middle East

By country:

- History of Bahrain
- History of Cyprus
- History of Egypt
- History of Iran
- History of Iraq
- History of Israel
- History of Jordan
- History of Kuwait
- History of Lebanon
- History of Oman
- History of Palestine
- History of Qatar
- History of Saudi Arabia
- History of Syria
- History of Turkey
- History of the United Arab Emirates
- History of Yemen
