= Upper Paleolithic in Georgia (country) =

Upper Paleolithic archaeology of Georgia

The Upper Paleolithic in Georgia extends from approximately 46,700–43,600 calibrated years before present (cal BP) to the beginning of the Holocene, around 11,700 cal BP. Its earliest securely dated occurrence, at Ortvala Klde, appeared after a probable break in occupation and has no identified technological roots in the preceding Middle Paleolithic assemblage.

Most excavated stratified sequences are concentrated in the limestone caves and rock shelters of Imereti in western Georgia. Paleoenvironmental evidence indicates that broadleaf woodland persisted locally in western Georgia during Late Pleistocene climatic fluctuations. Western cave sequences suggest an occupation hiatus in Imereti during the Last Glacial Maximum (LGM). Dated occupations on the Javakheti Plateau point to the use of the southern highlands during and after this period. Stone industries are dominated by blades and bladelets and combine distinctive regional forms with elements also known from southeastern Europe and the Levant. Bone points, awls, needles, personal ornaments, and worked plant fibers are also represented.

Human remains are scarce, and the earliest securely dated assemblage has not been assigned to a specific hominin species. Later dental remains from western Georgian caves were attributed to modern humans, although one tooth also displayed a feature found in Neanderthals. Genomic data from later pre-LGM contexts date to approximately 27,500–24,800 cal BP. These data are assigned to the genetic group Caucasus_UP. The post-LGM Caucasus hunter-gatherer population was genetically distinct but retained Caucasus_UP-related ancestry.

== Principal sites and chronology ==
Selected Upper Paleolithic sites in Georgia. Numbers run approximately west to east. Blue markers and † indicate sites that have yielded Upper Paleolithic human remains.
1. Apiancha; 2. Satsurblia†; 3. Sakajia Cave; 4. Tsutskhvati complex; 5. Devis Khvreli; 6. Gvardjilas Klde; 7. Ortvala Klde; 8. Bondi Cave†; 9. Dzudzuana†; 10. Kotias Klde†; 11. Paravani-2.

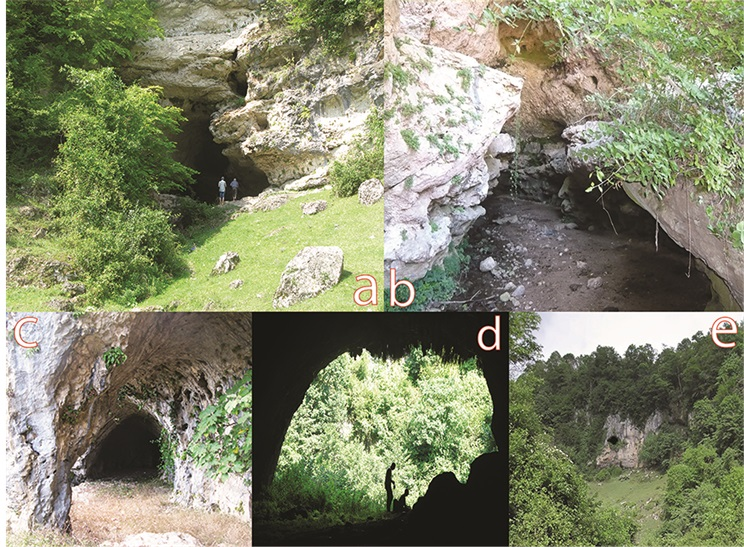
Caves of Imereti, including Dzudzuana (d)

Several Georgian cave sites have been attributed typologically to the Middle and Upper Paleolithic, but only a few of them have been excavated using modern standards. Many sites retain unresolved problems inherited from older, mostly 20th-century excavations, including insecure dating, mixed Chalcolithic and Upper Paleolithic deposits, stratigraphic inconsistencies, and poorly defined chronologies.

Most stratified and securely dated sequences are concentrated in the limestone caves and rock shelters of Imereti in western Georgia. The earliest is at Ortvala Klde, where Upper Paleolithic technologies appeared at approximately 46,700–43,600 cal BP, after a probable break in occupation. Bondi Cave contains an Upper Paleolithic sequence extending from approximately 40,000 to 27,000 cal BP, separated from its Middle Paleolithic deposits by a roof-collapse layer. Occupations at Bronze Cave in the Tsutskhvati complex date to approximately 35,000–30,000 cal BP, while the separate Ortvala Cave has been dated to about 30,200–29,900 cal BP. At Sakajia, renewed excavations found mixed upper deposits, and an earlier date from one of these deposits does not represent a reliable chronological marker for the Upper Paleolithic.

Dzudzuana records occupations at approximately 34,500–32,200, 27,000–24,000, and 16,500–13,200 cal BP, while those at Satsurblia date to approximately 32,200–31,500, 25,500–24,400, and 17,900–16,200 cal BP. Satsurblia also preserves living surfaces, combustion features, and a circular hearth bounded by cobbles. Together, the Dzudzuana and Satsurblia sequences suggest an occupation hiatus in Imereti during the Last Glacial Maximum, between approximately 24,400 and 17,900 cal BP.

Paravani-2, a rock shelter at 2,120 meters on the Javakheti Plateau in southern Georgia, was occupied at approximately 21,300–20,300 cal BP and again between approximately 16,600 and 15,000 cal BP. Other post-LGM occupations are recorded at Gvardjilas Klde and Apiancha, while final Upper Paleolithic assemblages are known from Kotias Klde, Sakajia, and Devis Khvreli.

== Technology and material culture ==
Upper Paleolithic stone and bone artifacts displayed at the Simon Janashia Museum of Georgia in Tbilisi

Early and pre-LGM stone industries in western Georgia focused on producing blades and smaller bladelets. Some bladelets were retouched or had one edge deliberately blunted. These tools resemble those of the Levantine Ahmarian, while Gravette points and specialized cores used to produce bladelets have parallels in southeastern Europe. The Georgian assemblages do not fit either tradition completely, however, and lack characteristic forms such as the finely retouched Dufour bladelets of the Aurignacian and the el-Wad points of the Ahmarian. Sakajia points, manufactured differently from Gravette points, represent a regional form.

Bladelet tools remained common after the Last Glacial Maximum. Assemblages from Dzudzuana, Satsurblia, and other Caucasian sites include variants of the microgravette point and geometric microliths such as rectangles and large segments. At Paravani-2, backed bladelets—blunted along one edge—and scalene triangles are represented, while microgravette points are poorly attested. Classification of these post-LGM assemblages as Epigravettian is disputed. During the Bølling–Allerød interstadial and Younger Dryas, backed bladelets, triangles, large segments, and shouldered points became more prominent.

Obsidian formed only a small part of the lithic assemblages at Bondi Cave and Ortvala Klde. Geochemical analysis identified material from Chikiani, approximately 170–180 kilometers away by the shortest walking route; other artifacts tentatively resembled sources more than 350 kilometers away in eastern Anatolia and Armenia; intermediary exchange is proposed to explain material originating at such distances. At Paravani-2, approximately 3 kilometers from Chikiani, obsidian comprised up to 99% of the Upper Paleolithic lithic material, and the excavators considered Chikiani its probable source.

Comparable lithic industries occur north of the Greater Caucasus. Mezmaiskaya Level 2 shares similarities with Ortvale Klde Layer 4. Dzudzuana Unit D also has affinities with material from Mezmaiskaya. Antonio Sagona consider these similarities as indicating movement across the mountain range.

Shell beads and grooved pendants

Decorated bone tools and a stone bowl with ochre

Upper Paleolithic artifacts from western Georgian sites, displayed at the Simon Janashia Museum of Georgia in Tbilisi

Worked osseous artifacts at Dzudzuana and Satsurblia include projectile points, awls, bone needles, intermediate pieces interpreted as chisels, and notched or incised bones. A study of personal ornaments from the two caves examined 19 perforated or grooved teeth, eight perforated or grooved bones, and one perforated fragment possibly made of antler. Manufacturing marks and use wear indicate that these objects were suspended as pendants or sewn onto clothing. Red deer teeth were preferentially selected, although red deer represented only about 2% of the faunal specimens in the Dzudzuana layers.

Microscopic remains from Dzudzuana include wild flax fibers from all major Upper Paleolithic units. Some fibers had been spun, twisted, knotted, or colored. Kvavadze and colleagues interpreted them as evidence of cord-making, basket-weaving, or garment-sewing. Associated animal hairs and other microremains may indicate the processing of fur, skin, and cloth.

== Subsistence and environment ==
Retouched tools in flint and obsidian tools from Paravani-2, Georgia (drawings by M. Arimura)

Subsistence was shaped by the local and seasonal availability of food resources. At Dzudzuana, aurochs, steppe bison, and Caucasian tur were the principal hunted species throughout the Upper Paleolithic. Some carcasses were field-butchered and dismembered before transport to the cave; bones were extensively broken for marrow. Hunting at Satsurblia also focused on wild boar and red deer alongside Caucasian tur and wild bovines. At the high-altitude site of Paravani-2, equids were particularly prominent in the earliest Upper Paleolithic layer, indicating a cold, dry, open landscape. Aurochs and small ruminants became more common in later layers.

Palynological studies on the southwestern flank of the Greater Caucasus and in the Lesser Caucasus indicate deciduous forests under warm and humid conditions between approximately 39,000 and 32,000 cal BP, followed by cooler and drier conditions and then a markedly colder period leading to the Last Glacial Maximum. Climate simulations identify the eastern Black Sea coast as a possible refugium for summer-green trees. At Ortvala Klde, phytolith evidence indicates that broadleaf deciduous vegetation remained relatively stable from approximately 60,000 to 25,000 years ago, including across the Late Middle–Early Upper Paleolithic transition. Based on these results, Jarl and colleagues considered climate unlikely to have contributed significantly to the demographic and behavioral changes associated with the transition. At Satsurblia, micro- and macrofaunal evidence indicates that woodland was more extensive during post-LGM occupations than during pre-LGM occupations.

== Human remains and ancient DNA ==
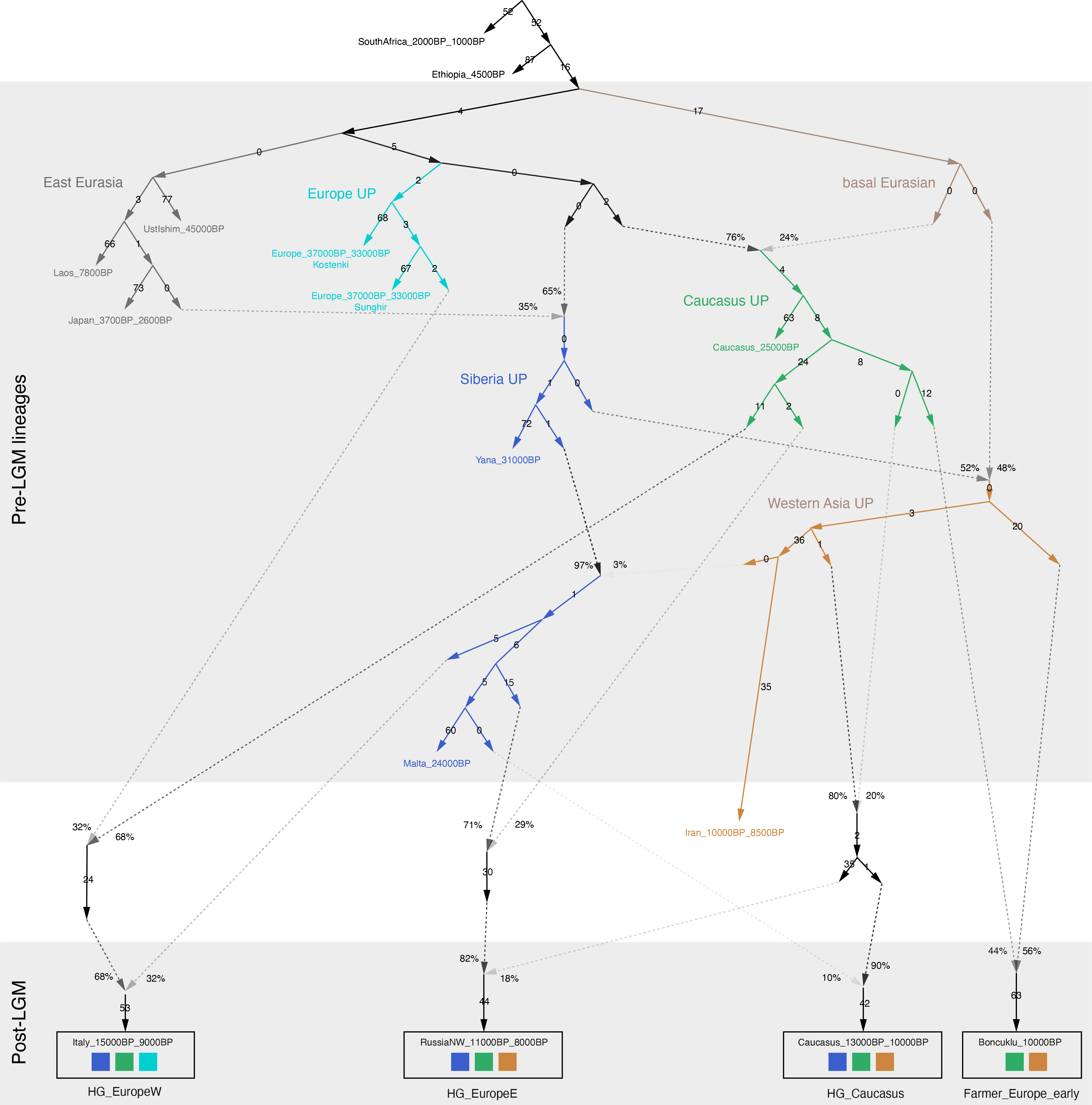
Admixture graph of deep Eurasian lineages showing Caucasus_UP (green) and the later Caucasus hunter-gatherer lineage (CHG; HG_Caucasus).

Human remains are scarce in Georgia's Upper Paleolithic record, and their taxonomic attribution is sometimes uncertain. Ortvala Klde has yielded neither diagnostic human fossils nor DNA, and its excavators did not assign its occupants to a species. At Bondi Cave, an isolated molar from layer Vb was provisionally attributed to Homo sapiens, although its features overlapped with those of both modern-human and Neanderthal specimens. Its estimated age of approximately 39,000–35,800 cal BP is based on a Bayesian model of the surrounding stratigraphic sequence; the tooth has not been directly dated.

Later remains from Dzudzuana layer C and Satsurblia include isolated deciduous teeth and, at Satsurblia, an incomplete left hemi-mandible with teeth. Morphological and morphometric analyses attributed the Dzudzuana tooth Dzu1 and the Satsurblia remains to modern humans. Dzu2 was also considered by Margherita and colleagues "most likely" modern human, although its crown outline fell within the Homo sapiens sample and its cervical outline within Neanderthal variation.

Pre-LGM genetic data are available from two individuals from Dzudzuana layer C, dated to approximately 27,500–25,200 cal BP; one individual from Kotias Klde layer C, dated to approximately 26,000–25,200 cal BP; and an environmental genome recovered from sediment in Satsurblia layer B/III, a level dated through associated ungulate remains to approximately 25,100–24,800 cal BP. These are assigned to the genetic group designated Caucasus_UP. A post-LGM individual from Satsurblia layer B/I, dated to approximately 13,400–13,200 cal BP, is assigned to the Caucasus hunter-gatherer genetic group (CHG). Genetic modeling attributes approximately 18% of CHG ancestry to Caucasus_UP, 72% to a Western Asian Upper Paleolithic population, and 10% to Ancient North Eurasian ancestry.
