= Bondi Cave =

- ბონდის მღვიმე (Georgian)
- Location in Georgia
- 42°20′03.7″N 43°16′35.4″E
- Type: Cave; archaeological site
- Periods: Late Middle Paleolithic; Upper Paleolithic
- Cultures: Mousterian
- Location: Tsirkvali, Chiatura Municipality, Imereti, Georgia
- Region: Rioni–Qvirila basin
- Nearest city: Chiatura

Site notes
- Material: Limestone
- Elevation: 477 metres (1,565 ft)
- Excavation dates: 2007; 2009–2010; 2013; from 2024
- Archaeologists: Nikoloz Tushabramishvili; Marie-Hélène Moncel; David Pleurdeau
- Discovered: 2006

Bondi Cave (Georgian: ბონდის მღვიმე) is a limestone cave and archaeological site near the village of Tsirkvali in Chiatura Municipality, Imereti, western Georgia. Its deposits preserve late Middle Paleolithic and Upper Paleolithic occupations separated by a major roof-fall layer and an occupational hiatus. The site contributes evidence about stone-tool technology, hunting, long-distance movement of obsidian, and the Middle-to-Upper Paleolithic transition in the South Caucasus. It has also yielded an isolated human tooth provisionally attributed to Homo sapiens.

Most samples from the Middle Paleolithic layers are too old to yield precise radiocarbon dates. The main Upper Paleolithic sequence begins around 40,000 calibrated years before present (cal BP) and records occupations until approximately 17,000 cal BP.

== Location and setting ==
Bondi Cave opens southward above the Tabagrebi River, a tributary of the Qvirila. It lies about 6 kilometres (3.7 mi) northwest of Chiatura, 7 to 8 kilometres (4.3 to 5.0 mi) from the Ortvala Klde Paleolithic site, and 30 metres (98 ft) above the valley floor, at an elevation of 477 metres (1,565 ft). The cave was named after the Bondi bridge between Tsirkvali and Tabagrebi, one of whose piers stands directly above it.

The chamber covers approximately 101 square metres (1,090 sq ft) and is about 7 metres (23 ft) wide, with an entrance reaching 9 metres (30 ft) in height. A preliminary description gave its depth as 11 metres (36 ft), while the later site survey recorded a maximum length of 18 metres (59 ft).

== Research history ==
Georgian archaeologist Nikoloz Tushabramishvili discovered Bondi Cave in 2006 during a Georgian–French archaeological survey. Excavations were conducted in 2007, 2009–2010, and 2013. The principal early excavation covered approximately 8 square metres (86 sq ft) near the entrance and exposed more than 3.2 metres (10 ft) of sediment without reaching bedrock. A separate sounding outside the entrance contained mixed Middle and Upper Paleolithic material.

Finds from these excavations are held by the Georgian National Museum. Excavation resumed in 2024 through a field-school project involving Ilia State University and the UK-based archaeological company Past to Present Archaeology.

== Stratigraphy and chronology ==
The excavated sequence at Bondi Cave comprises eight principal lithological layers. Layers VII and VIII form the lower complex and contain a Middle Paleolithic assemblage. Layer VI represents a major roof collapse and contains only sparse archaeological material, including some Upper Paleolithic artifacts interpreted as having moved downward from layer V. The upper complex, comprising layers V–II, preserves successive Upper Paleolithic occupations. Layer I is a mixed surface deposit containing later prehistoric and historical material.

Early radiocarbon measurements placed layer VII between approximately 38,700 and 35,000 radiocarbon years BP, or about 43,000–40,000 cal BP, and layers V–III between approximately 24,600 and 14,000 radiocarbon years BP, or about 29,000–17,000 cal BP. Subsequent AMS dating using ultrafiltered bone collagen produced minimum ages for five of six samples from layer VII; the sixth result lay close to the upper limit of radiocarbon dating. The investigators therefore regarded the earlier finite dates as underestimates and concluded that layers VII and VIII were at or beyond the effective radiocarbon range.

Bayesian modeling indicates that layer V, the earliest clearly Upper Paleolithic occupation, spans approximately 40,000–34,000 cal BP. Layer IV includes an occupation around 31,000 cal BP, while layer III dates to approximately 17,500 cal BP. No transitional assemblage combining Middle and Upper Paleolithic features was identified. The roof-fall deposit, radiocarbon results, and technological contrast were interpreted as evidence of a hiatus of several thousand years between the Middle and Upper Paleolithic occupations.

== Archaeological assemblages ==
=== Stone tools and raw materials ===
The Middle Paleolithic assemblage from layers VII and VIII was made from local flint and includes thick flakes and blades produced using Levallois and discoidal methods. The more abundant Upper Paleolithic assemblages emphasize blades and bladelets. Cores, flakes, and production debris show that flint tools were produced and maintained in the cave.

The 2010 preliminary report compared the Upper Paleolithic industry with that of Dzudzuana Cave and noted forms described as "Aurignacoid". A later technological study in 2016 did not classify the assemblage as Early Aurignacian because it lacked several artifacts characteristic of that tradition. Flint or chert accounts for nearly all of the stone artifacts, but small quantities of obsidian occur in the Upper Paleolithic layers. Several pieces were traced to the Chikiani–Paravani source area in southern Georgia, more than 100 kilometres (62 mi) from Bondi, while two others have chemical affinities with possible sources in eastern Anatolia. Their presence points to long-distance movement of raw material.

=== Subsistence and environment ===
The Upper Paleolithic faunal assemblages are dominated by Caucasian tur and bison. Cut marks, percussion damage, and fresh-bone fractures show that humans processed the ungulates. Tur were generally brought to the cave complete or nearly complete, whereas bison were initially butchered elsewhere and selected parts were transported to the site. Carnivores also occupied the cave but played a more limited role in accumulating the Upper Paleolithic remains.

Animal, pollen, and other plant evidence indicates a varied setting that included grassland, woodland, riverside habitats, and nearby upland environments. Vegetation shifted between colder, drier phases and warmer periods, while burned bone, flint, charcoal, and wood provide intermittent evidence of fire. Worked objects from the Upper Paleolithic deposits include bone awls, a modified antler tip, and a burned bone fragment bearing incised marks whose meaning remains unknown. A small perforated cockle-shell ornament was found in sublayer Vb near the human tooth.

== Human tooth and the Paleolithic transition ==
An isolated, heavily worn lower right molar, known as Bondi 1, was recovered from Upper Paleolithic sublayer Vb. It is most likely a deciduous second molar from a juvenile, although identification as a permanent first molar cannot be excluded. Its dimensions and preserved morphology overlap those of both modern humans and Neanderthals and do not provide a secure taxonomic identification. The investigators provisionally attributed the tooth to Homo sapiens while emphasizing the need for additional human remains.

Bondi 1 has not been dated directly. Bayesian modeling of the surrounding deposits places it between approximately 39,000 and 35,800 cal BP, provided that it remained in its original stratigraphic position. If this modeled age and its provisional attribution to Homo sapiens are correct, it would be among the earliest modern-human fossils reported from the Caucasus. Direct dating would be required to confirm its age.

The 2016 study interpreted the Bondi sequence as showing a cultural and chronological discontinuity between the Middle and Upper Paleolithic occupations. Because the two complexes are separated by an occupational hiatus, the authors concluded that Bondi could not demonstrate whether population replacement occurred rapidly. No human remains were reported from the Middle Paleolithic layers.
