= Godogani =

Godogani (Georgian: გოდოგანი) may refer to the following places in Georgia:

- Godogani, Imereti, a village in Terjola Municipality
- Godogani, Samegrelo-Zemo Svaneti, a village in Martvili Municipality
