= Dzudzuana Cave =

Upper Paleolithic cave site in western Georgia

- ძუძუანას მღვიმე (Georgian)
- Location in Georgia
- 42.3129°N 43.3178°E
- Type: Karst cave; archaeological site
- Periods: Upper Paleolithic; Late Neolithic/Eneolithic
- Location: Mghvimevi, Chiatura Municipality, Imereti, Georgia

Site notes
- Material: Limestone
- Elevation: 560 m (1,837 ft)
- Excavation dates: 1966–1975; 1996–2008
- Archaeologists: David Tushabramishvili; Tengiz Meshveliani; Ofer Bar-Yosef
- Discovered: 1966

Dzudzuana Cave (Georgian: ძუძუანას მღვიმე) is a karst cave and archaeological site in Chiatura Municipality, Imereti, western Georgia.

Dzudzuana preserves one of the principal Upper Paleolithic sequences in Georgia, with occupations dated to approximately 34,500–32,200, 27,000–24,000, and 16,500–13,200 calibrated years before present (cal BP). Its assemblages include stone and bone tools, personal ornaments, animal and plant remains, and microscopic wild flax fibers. The cave has also yielded evidence concerning its occupants: two deciduous human teeth, one attributed to a Early modern human and the other considered most likely modern human, and genetic data assigned to the Caucasus_UP group.

== Geography and research history ==
The cave is located at the village of Mghvimevi in the valley of the Nekrisi River, a tributary of the Qvirila, and is formed in limestone. It lies approximately 560 m (1,837 ft) above sea level and 12 m (39 ft) above the river channel. The large, elongated karst cavity forms a tunnel from which a small creek flows over the archaeological deposits. Ortvale Klde lies about 5 km (3.1 mi) away.

Dzudzuana was discovered in 1966 by a Georgian State Museum expedition led by David Tushabramishvili, who directed excavations until 1975. Approximately 40 m^{2} (430 sq ft) near the entrance was excavated to bedrock in 10-centimeter levels, without wet-sieving. The stratigraphy was divided into an Upper Eneolithic layer and an Upper Paleolithic layer, the latter subdivided into eight sublayers.

Tengiz Meshveliani and Ofer Bar-Yosef led renewed excavations from 1996 to 2008. Approximately 24 m^{2} (260 sq ft) was excavated in lower and upper areas, where deposits reached depths of 4.5 m (15 ft) and 3.25 m (10.7 ft), respectively. The sediments were wet-sieved, dried, and hand-picked. Geoarchaeological observations provided the basis for dividing the lower sequence into Units A–D; Unit C was further divided into C1–C5.

== Stratigraphy and chronology ==
Units D and C were deposited mainly by mudflows. Unit B consists largely of clay accumulated through dripping water or groundwater. Its artifacts and animal remains occur in gravel and clay lenses, suggesting that post-depositional processes probably disturbed their original spatial distribution. Much of Unit A was removed during the first excavation campaign. The excavators considered it possible that flowing water had eroded or redeposited some deposits, contributing to chronological gaps and anomalies.

Thirty radiocarbon determinations from animal bones and charcoal date Unit D to approximately 34,500–32,200 cal BP, Unit C to 27,000–24,000 cal BP, and Unit B to 16,500–13,200 cal BP. Unit A dates to the 7th millennium BP and was assigned to the Late Neolithic/Eneolithic. Classical and medieval pottery indicates brief later use of the cave.

== Archaeological remains ==
=== Stone and bone industries ===
Upper Paleolithic stone tools from Dzudzuana at Moscow State Historical Museum

decorated bone artifacts from Dzudzuana at the Simon Janashia Museum of Georgia in Tbilisi

Most chipped stone was made from local chert known as radiolarite, available on the plateau above the cave and in the riverbed. Obsidian occurs only in small quantities. In Unit D, endscrapers outnumber burins, while most bone tools are awls or points. Other finds include a bone fragment incised with two triangles and an antler bipoint.

Unit C is characterized by small blades and bladelets produced mainly from narrow carinated cores, with retouched bladelets forming the largest tool category. Sakajia points—named after Sakajia Cave—occur in small numbers. These are curved or arched pointed blades with abrupt retouch along the straight edge and a retouched truncation across the base. Because characteristic Aurignacian tool types are absent, the excavators did not treat the carinated cores alone as evidence of an Aurignacian industry. Bone artifacts include awls, points, an eyed needle, robust antler points, a bovid-rib polisher, a rib spatula, and a bone retoucher.

Unit B contains microgravette points and backed or retouched bladelets. Microgravette points become less frequent toward the top of the unit, and endscrapers continue to outnumber burins. The worked-bone assemblage from the renewed excavations includes an incised rib fragment.

=== Ornaments and fibers ===
Unit C yielded 12 pendants: nine made from animal teeth and three from bone. Six tooth pendants were vestigial red deer canines; the others were incisors from red deer, a bovine, and Caucasian tur. The bone pendants were shaped to resemble vestigial red deer canines. Polish within the perforations and breakage along some hole edges indicate prolonged use, consistent with the objects being worn suspended or sewn onto clothing. Seven of the nine tooth pendants were made from red deer teeth, although red deer accounted for only about 2% of the identified ungulate specimens.

Microscopic analysis identified wild flax fibers throughout the sequence, with the highest concentration in early Unit C. Some fibers had been spun, twisted, or dyed, and Unit C yielded a string with numerous knots. These finds suggest the production of cord for hafting stone tools, woven baskets, and sewn garments. Associated tur hairs, skin-beetle and moth remains, and spores of a fungus associated with textiles may reflect the processing of fur, skin, and cloth.

== Subsistence and environment ==
Faunal remains are dominated throughout the Upper Paleolithic sequence by aurochs, steppe bison, and Caucasian tur. Red deer, wild horse, wild boar, hare, and several carnivores occur less frequently. Long bones were extensively broken for marrow, and cut marks document several stages of butchery. Some carcasses were field-butchered and dismembered before being transported to the cave. Juvenile animal remains and comparison with nearby Ortvale Klde led to the suggestion that Dzudzuana was occupied mainly from late spring to early autumn.

Pollen documents repeated environmental change, with warmer and wetter conditions alternating with colder and drier phases. The later Upper Paleolithic deposits record a shift from alpine vegetation near the cave to more humid conditions and the development of spruce, fir, and pine forest.

== Human remains and genetics ==
Two isolated deciduous molars have been described from Unit C. Dzu1 is an upper right second deciduous molar from subunit C3, and Dzu2 a lower right second deciduous molar from subunit C4. Root resorption suggests that both teeth were lost during life when their owners were approximately 9-12 years old. Their occlusal contacts suggest that they came from different individuals.

Morphological and morphometric analyses supported the attribution of Dzu1 to a modern human. Dzu2's crown outline fell within the Homo sapiens sample, whereas its cervical outline fell within Neanderthal variation. Margherita and colleagues considered Dzu2 most likely modern human but stated that further work was needed.

Genetic data have been reported for two Unit C individuals, listed as I2949 ("Dzu2") and I2963 ("Dzu3") and dated to approximately 27,500–25,200 cal BP. Together with pre-LGM individuals from Kotias Klde and Satsurblia, they are assigned to the genetic group designated Caucasus_UP, which differs from the post-LGM Caucasus hunter-gatherer grouping.
