= Djruchula Cave =

Middle Paleolithic archaeological site in Georgia

- ჯრუჭულას მღვიმე (Georgian)
- Jruchula Cave
- Location in Georgia
- 42.342394°N 43.346219°E
- Type: Cave; archaeological site
- Periods: Early Middle Paleolithic
- Cultures: Mousterian
- Location: Kvemo Zodi, Chiatura Municipality, Imereti, Georgia
- Region: Qvirila basin
- Nearest city: Chiatura

Site notes
- Material: Limestone
- Elevation: 600 metres (2,000 ft)
- Excavation dates: 1959–1966
- Archaeologists: Davit M. Tushabramishvili
- Discovered: 1958

Djruchula Cave (Georgian: ჯრუჭულას მღვიმე; also Jruchula Cave) is a limestone cave and Middle Paleolithic archaeological site near Kvemo Zodi in Chiatura Municipality, Imereti, western Georgia. Its excavated sequence contains two early Middle Paleolithic occupation units dated to approximately 260,000–210,000 and 140,000 years ago. The site is known for blade-rich Mousterian assemblages that combine Levallois and volumetric laminar reduction, as well as for an isolated molar attributed to a Neanderthal.

== Location and setting ==
Djruchula Cave lies in the Qvirila River basin, on the right bank of the Djruchula River in the southern foothills of the Greater Caucasus. The cave is formed in Upper Cretaceous limestone at an elevation of about 600 metres (2,000 ft) and opens toward the northeast. It is approximately 30 metres (98 ft) long and up to 11.5 metres (38 ft) wide, with a floor area of about 200 square metres (2,200 sq ft). The cave is dry and contains small speleothems as well as archaeological deposits.

Flint occurs widely in the surrounding Cretaceous limestone and in river gravels. Red and brownish-yellow flint found among the artifacts was probably obtained from outcrops on the plateau within several kilometers of the cave, while lower-quality flint and argillite were collected from nearby river gravels.

== Research history ==
The cave was surveyed in 1957–1958 and recognized as a Paleolithic site during this work. Davit M. Tushabramishvili directed excavations from 1959 to 1966. Most of the cave deposit was removed during the excavations, although a sediment profile was retained along the rear wall. The recovered archaeological material is held by the Georgian National Museum.

== Stratigraphy and chronology ==
The stratigraphic sequence, approximately 4 metres (13 ft) deep, was grouped into two archaeological units. Layers II–VII form the younger unit and layers XI–XIII the older one; layers VIII–X constitute an approximately 1 metre (3.3 ft)-thick archaeologically sterile interval between them.

The chronology was established by thermoluminescence dating of six heated flint artifacts selected from the museum collections. Four samples from the older archaeological unit produced ages between approximately 259,000 and 210,000 years, while two samples from the younger unit dated to about 140,000 and 138,000 years ago. The results indicate occupations approximately 260,000–210,000 years ago and again around 140,000 years ago. The intervening sterile deposit represents a long occupational hiatus, although erosion may also have affected this part of the sequence.

These dates place Djruchula among the earliest securely dated Middle Paleolithic sites in Georgia. No Upper Paleolithic occupation has been identified in the cave.

== Archaeological assemblages ==
Both archaeological units contain Mousterian assemblages characterized by substantial production of elongated blanks and retouched points. Toolmakers used Levallois reduction alongside a volumetric laminar method in which narrow, often thick blades were removed from convex, semi-prismatic cores. The retouched toolkits are dominated by elongated points and blades; scrapers and denticulates also occur. Some points were partially shaped on both faces by invasive retouch, a feature associated with the traditionally defined Djruchula–Kudaro group.

The low artifact densities have been interpreted as evidence of brief occupations, possibly as a seasonal hunting camp, rather than use as a central habitation site. The older unit contains more cores, flakes, and evidence of on-site reduction using local materials. In the younger unit, prepared blanks and finished points were more commonly brought into the cave and maintained there.

Most artifacts were made from nearby flint sources. Obsidian occurs only in very small quantities; the nearest known source discussed in the dating study is at Chikiani, near Paravani Lake, more than 100 kilometres (62 mi) southeast of the cave.

== Human remains and regional comparisons ==
In 1960, an upper first molar attributed to an adult Neanderthal was recovered near a hearth in the older archaeological unit. Djruchula's combination of Levallois and laminar reduction and its numerous elongated points has been compared with early Middle Paleolithic assemblages at Hayonim, Hummal, and Abou Sif in the Levant. The available evidence could not distinguish among population expansion, information exchange over large territories, and independent technological convergence.
