= Ortvala Klde =

- ორთვალა კლდე (Georgian)
- Ortvale Klde
- Location in Georgia
- 42°19′20.9″N 43°15′40.3″E
- Type: Rockshelter; archaeological site
- Periods: Late Middle Paleolithic; Early Upper Paleolithic
- Cultures: Mousterian
- Location: Didi Rgani, Chiatura Municipality, Imereti, Georgia
- Region: Rioni–Qvirila basin
- Nearest city: Chiatura

Site notes
- Material: Limestone
- Elevation: 530 metres (1,740 ft)
- Excavation dates: 1973–1992; 1997–2001; 2006–2007
- Archaeologists: Davit Tushabramishvili; Nikoloz Tushabramishvili; Daniel S. Adler; Marie-Hélène Moncel; David Pleurdeau
- Discovered: 1973

Ortvala Klde (Georgian: ორთვალა კლდე), frequently published as Ortvale Klde in English-language archaeological literature, is a two-chamber limestone rockshelter at the village of Didi Rgani, near Chiatura, in the Imereti region of western Georgia. It preserves one of the most detailed successions of late Middle Paleolithic and early Upper Paleolithic occupations in the Caucasus. Excavations have recovered Mousterian and Early Upper Paleolithic stone tools, animal bones, bone artifacts, hearth remains, and an isolated tooth attributed to a Neanderthal. It is distinct from Ortvala Cave (ორთვალა მღვიმე), a separate Middle Paleolithic locality near Godogani in Terjola Municipality.

Revised chronological modeling places the end of the Middle Paleolithic at approximately 47,500–44,200 calibrated years before present (cal BP) and the beginning of the Early Upper Paleolithic at approximately 46,700–43,600 cal BP. Although these ranges overlap statistically, the stratigraphy, condition of the artifacts, and technological contrast between the assemblages favor an occupational hiatus of uncertain duration.

== Location and setting ==
Ortvala Klde lies northwest of Chiatura in a Cretaceous limestone formation overlooking the Cherula, a right-bank tributary of the Qvirila. The east-facing shelter stands about 35 metres (115 ft) above the river and 530 metres (1,740 ft) above sea level. Its Georgian name, meaning "two-eyed rock", refers to its two adjacent chambers. The surrounding karst landscape contains numerous caves and high-quality flint outcrops, while the river valley and neighboring uplands provided access to both wooded and open habitats.

== Research history ==
The site was discovered in 1973 by the Rioni–Qvirila archaeological expedition of the Georgian State Museum, directed by Davit Tushabramishvili. Georgian excavations continued intermittently until 1992. A Georgian–American project directed by Nikoloz Tushabramishvili and Daniel S. Adler reinvestigated the southern chamber from 1997 to 2001, applying modern excavation, taphonomic, and dating methods. A Georgian–French team began excavating the northern chamber in 2006.

Early publications differed over whether part of layer 4 represented a gradual transition between the two periods. Subsequent excavation identified localized mixing but assigned the principal layer 4 assemblage to the Upper Paleolithic. The chronology first modeled in detail in 2008 was revised in 2021 using new radiocarbon measurements, updated calibration, Bayesian modeling, and volcanic-ash correlations.

== Stratigraphy and chronology ==
The best-known sequence comes from the southern chamber. Layers 7–5 contain the late Middle Paleolithic occupations. The upper surface of layer 5 bears weathered and patinated artifacts and is capped by compact roof rubble. Above it, subdivisions 4d–4a contain the earliest Upper Paleolithic assemblage; layers 3 and 2 preserve later and generally less intensive Upper Paleolithic activity. Hearths, ash lenses, charcoal, and burned stone occur within layer 4.

Excavation in the northern chamber identified three Middle Paleolithic units, MP1–MP3, beneath an Upper Paleolithic deposit. The northern assemblages differ from those in the southern chamber and have not been securely correlated with them layer by layer. The 2013 report also regarded their chronology as less secure.

Micromorphological study found evidence of freezing, thawing, and biological disturbance, but little large-scale movement of artifacts across the principal boundaries. The weathered surface above layer 5 and the roof-fall horizons separating later occupations support periods of abandonment rather than continuous deposition. The revised model dates the end of the Middle Paleolithic to 47,501–44,191 cal BP and the beginning of the Early Upper Paleolithic to 46,735–43,589 cal BP.

== Paleoenvironment ==
Sediments at Ortvala Klde record recurrent cold conditions and freeze–thaw activity during the formation of the sequence, but the immediate surroundings were not continuously treeless. A phytolith study covering approximately 60,000–25,000 years ago found woody plants and herbaceous eudicots throughout the late Middle-to-early Upper Paleolithic sequence. The study interpreted this as relative stability in local vegetation and found no evidence that a major environmental change at the rockshelter coincided with the technological transition.

== Archaeological assemblages ==
=== Middle Paleolithic ===
Middle Paleolithic stone working in the southern chamber was based mainly on recurrent, often unidirectional Levallois reduction. Knappers produced elongated flakes and pointed blanks, many of which were retouched as scrapers or unifacial points. Local flint predominates, and cores and production debris show that tools were made and maintained within the shelter. The northern chamber also preserves discoidal reduction and limited blade production alongside Levallois methods.

=== Upper Paleolithic ===
The earliest Upper Paleolithic assemblage is based largely on unidirectional blade and bladelet production. It includes endscrapers, burins, retouched bladelets, and tools made from bone or antler. Its reduction methods and tool forms differ markedly from those in the underlying Middle Paleolithic layers, and no undisturbed assemblage combining the principal features of both technologies has been identified. Comparisons with Dzudzuana Cave and Bondi Cave place Ortvala Klde within the varied early Upper Paleolithic of western Georgia.

== Subsistence and raw materials ==
Humans were the principal accumulators and modifiers of the large-animal remains. Caucasian tur dominates the fauna, with steppe bison represented in much smaller quantities. Cut marks, impact fractures, and skeletal-part representation document hunting, butchery, and carcass processing. Prey choice and processing remained broadly similar across the technological change. The site has been interpreted as a repeatedly used hunting location, probably occupied mainly between late autumn and early spring.

Most stone tools were made from locally available flint. Obsidian is uncommon in the Middle Paleolithic deposits and more frequent in the Upper Paleolithic. Geochemical analyses traced some pieces to the Chikiani–Paravani area, more than 100 kilometres (62 mi) away. The material indicates long-distance movement or exchange.

== Human remains and the Middle–Upper Paleolithic transition ==
An isolated lower second molar from a Middle Paleolithic layer has been attributed to a Neanderthal. It has not been directly dated, and its estimated age depends on its stratigraphic association. The biological identity of the site's Early Upper Paleolithic occupants remains uncertain, and the revised chronological study did not assign them to a particular hominin species.

Ortvala Klde has played a major role in debate about the disappearance of Neanderthals and the arrival of modern humans in the South Caucasus. Earlier interpretations used the then-available chronology to support a gap between them and rapid population replacement. The revised study likewise found no technological roots for the Early Upper Paleolithic assemblage in the preceding Middle Paleolithic and inferred a probable Middle Paleolithic population vacuum at the site, while arguing that the wider evidence calls a simplistic replacement model into question. The revised chronology places the Early Upper Paleolithic occupation among the earliest securely dated examples in the Caucasus.
