= Basal Eurasian =

Proposed lineage of anatomically modern humans

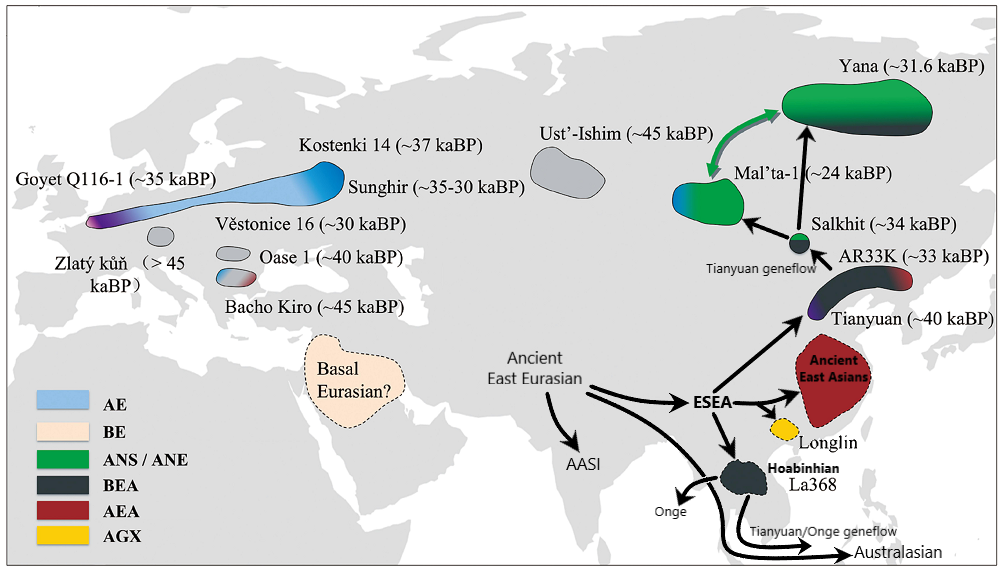
- Basal Eurasian ("BE") located in the Middle East
- Geographical range: The Middle East, perhaps specifically around the Persian Gulf region, with a 'Common Eurasian Hub' in the Iranian Plateau
- Dates: c. 60,000-26,000 years ago
- Type site: Dzudzuana Cave in Georgia dating to 26,000 years ago which have around 30% Basal Eurasian ancestry, with the rest being Common West Eurasian
- Characteristics: A 2016 study by Lazaridis et al. found that populations with higher levels of Basal Eurasian ancestry have lower levels of Neanderthal ancestry, which suggests that Basal Eurasians had lower levels of Neanderthal ancestry compared with other non-Africans. Genetic and archaeological evidence for interactions between modern humans and Neanderthals may allow certain areas, such as the Levant, to be ruled out as possible sources for Basal Eurasians.
- Preceded by: Diverged from other Early human migrations after the Out-of-African migration, representing a sibling lineage to other Eurasians
- Followed by: Likely admixed into West Eurasian groups present in West Asia as early as 26,000 years ago, prior to the Last Glacial Maximum, with this ancestry being subsequently spread by later migrations, such as those of the Anatolian hunter-gatherers and subsequent Anatolian Neolithic Farmers and Early European Farmers into Europe during the Holocene
- Cause of collapse: Diverged into Ancient West Eurasians, possibly including Iranian hunter-gatherers, and Ancient East Eurasians.

Basal Eurasian is a proposed lineage of anatomically modern humans with reduced, or zero, Neanderthal admixture (ancestry) compared to other ancient non-Africans. They diverged from other Eurasians after the Out-of-African migration and represent a sister lineage to other Eurasians. Basal Eurasians originate from the Southern Middle East, specifically from Prehistoric Arabia, or North Africa, and are said to have contributed ancestry to various West Eurasian, South Asian, and Central Asian as well as African groups.

This Basal Eurasian component is also proposed to explain the lower archaic admixture among modern West Eurasians compared with East Eurasians, although alternative explanations without need of such Basal admixture exist as well. Basal Eurasian ancestry had likely admixed into West Eurasian groups present in West Asia as early as 26,000 years ago, prior to the Last Glacial Maximum, with this ancestry being subsequently spread by later migrations, such as those of the Anatolian Neolithic Farmers into Europe during the Holocene.

== Description ==
A 2014 study by Lazaridis et al. demonstrated that modern Europeans can be modelled as an admixture of three ancestral populations; Ancient North Eurasians (ANE), Western Hunter-Gatherers (WHG), and Early European Farmers (EEF). This same study showed that EEFs harbour ancestry from a hypothetical non-African 'ghost' population which the authors name 'Basal Eurasians'. This group, who have not yet been sampled from ancient remains, are thought to have diverged from all non-African populations c. 60,000 to 100,000 years ago, before non-Africans admixed with Neanderthals (c. 50,000 to 60,000 years ago) and diversified from each other.

A 2016 study by Lazaridis et al. found that populations with higher levels of Basal Eurasian ancestry have lower levels of Neanderthal ancestry, which suggests that Basal Eurasians had lower levels of Neanderthal ancestry compared with other non-Africans. A 2021 study by Ferreira et al. suggested that Basal Eurasians diverged from other Eurasians between 50,000 and 60,000 years ago, and lived somewhere in the Arabian peninsula, specifically the Persian Gulf region, shortly before proper Eurasians admixed with a Neanderthal population, in a region stretching from the Levant to northern Iran.

Vallini et al. 2024 argues that the Basal Eurasian lineage diverged from other Eurasians soon after the Out-of-Africa migration, and subsequently became isolated, until it started to mix with other populations in the Middle East since around 25,000 years ago. These different Middle Eastern populations would later spread Basal Eurasian ancestry via the Neolithic Revolution to all of Western Eurasia.

In modern populations, Neanderthal ancestry is around 10% to 20% lower in West Eurasians than East Eurasians, with intermediate levels found in South and Central Asian populations. Although a scenario involving multiple admixture events between modern humans and Neanderthals is an alternative possibility, the most likely explanation for this is that Neanderthal ancestry in West Eurasians and South and Central Asians was diluted by admixture with Basal Eurasian groups.

== Possible geographic origins ==
The earliest evidence of Basal Eurasian ancestry is found in individuals from Dzudzuana Cave in Georgia dating to 26,000 years ago which have around 30% Basal Eurasian ancestry, with the rest being Common West Eurasian.

Basal Eurasians may have originated in a region stretching from North Africa to the Middle East, before admixing with West-Eurasian populations. North Africa has been described as a strong candidate for the location of the emergence of Basal Eurasians by Loosdrecht et al. in 2018.

Ferreira et al. in 2021 argued for a point of origin for Basal Eurasians into the Middle East, specifically in the Persian Gulf region on the Arab peninsula. As Basal Eurasians had low levels of Neanderthal ancestry, genetic and archaeological evidence for interactions between modern humans and Neanderthals may allow certain areas, such as the Levant, to be ruled out as possible sources for Basal Eurasians. In other areas, such as southern Southwest Asia, there is currently no evidence for an overlap between modern human and Neanderthal populations. Vallini et al. 2024 suggests a homeland for Basal Eurasians in the Arabian Peninsula and for 'Common Eurasian', known also as 'Eurasian Hub', in the Iranian Plateau, where they diverged into 'Common West Eurasians' and 'Common East Eurasians'.

== Estimated Basal Eurasian ancestry in ancient and modern populations ==
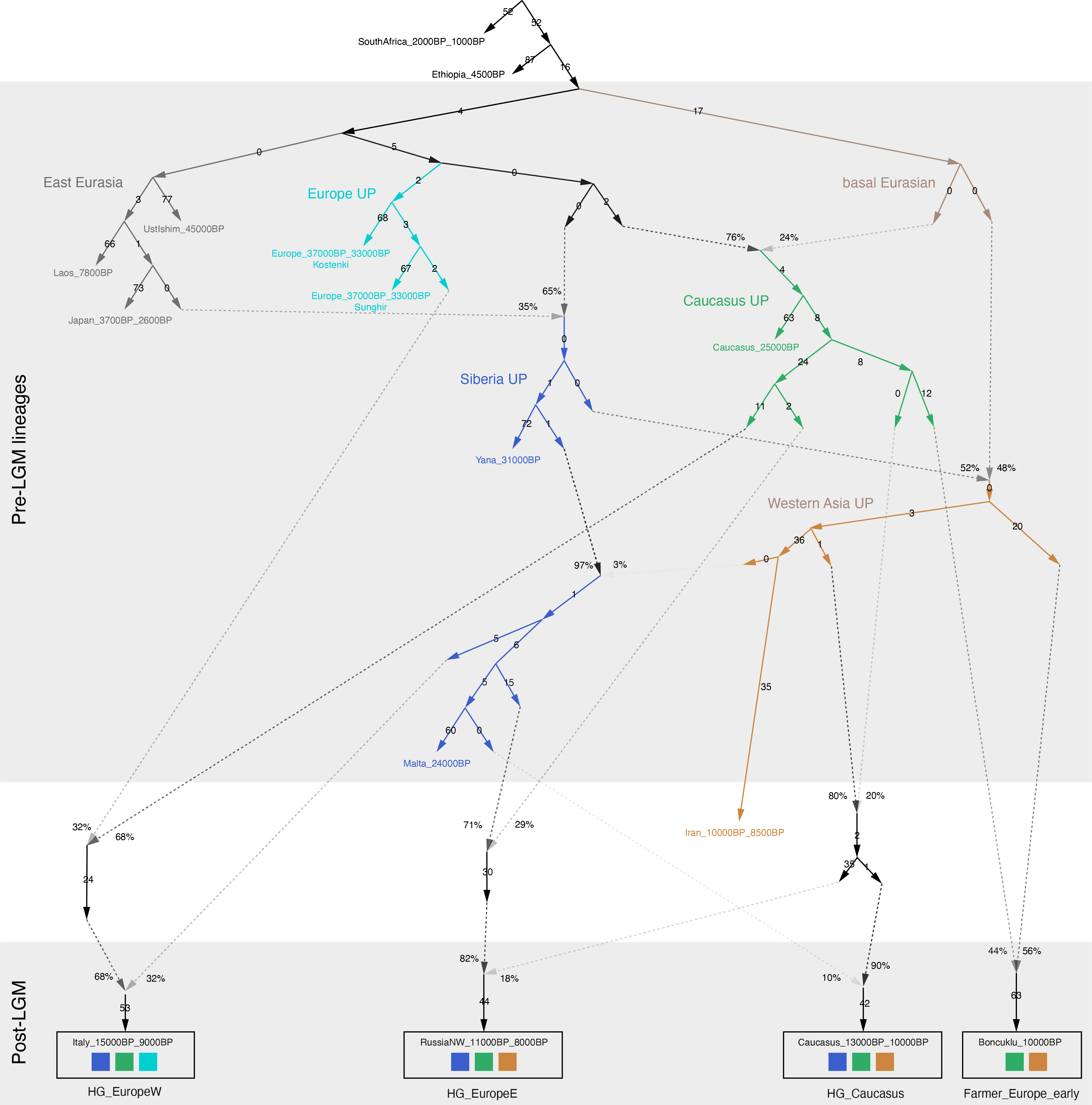
An admixture graph model showing Basal Eurasian branch according to Allentoft et al. 2024

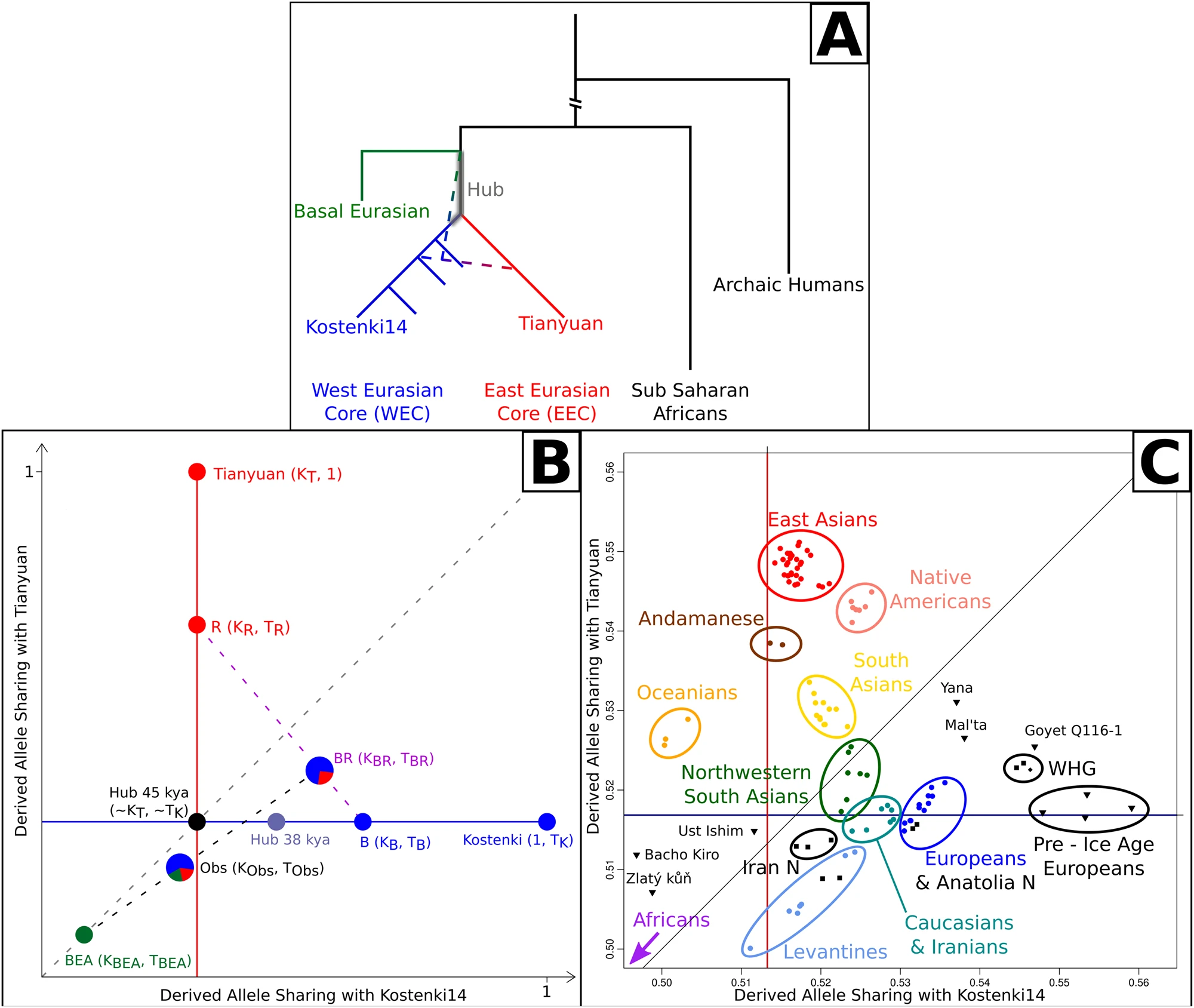
The phylogenetic position of Basal Eurasians in a wider Eurasian context

An estimation for Holocene-era Near Easterners (e.g., Mesolithic Caucasus hunter-gatherers, Mesolithic and Neolithic Iranians, and Natufians) suggests that they formed from a combination of Basal Eurasian ancestry, and Western Hunter-Gatherer-related (WHG) and or Ancient North Eurasians-related (ANE) ancestries respectively.

The Mesolithic and Neolithic Iranian lineage is inferred to derived between 38–48% ancestry from Basal Eurasians respectively, with the remainder ancestry being made up by Ancient North Eurasian or Eastern Hunter-Gatherer (EHG) like ancestry, while Natufians derived a mean average of 50% Basal and 50% 'unknown hunter-gatherer' ancestry being closer to Western Hunter-Gatherers (WHG). Alternatively, Mesolithic and Neolithic Iranians derive most of their ancestry from a deep West Eurasian source (WEC2; c. 72%) with c. 18% Basal Eurasian and c. 10% Ancient East Eurasian admixture.

It has been found that the "models of genetic history of West Asian human populations who are modeled as a mixture of 'basal Eurasians' and West European hunter–gatherers" is in agreement with the genomic data on 'East Mediterranean Dogs', who "are modeled as a mixture of a basal branch (splitting deeper than the divergence of the Asian and European dogs) and West European dogs".

The Ancient North African Iberomaurusian (Taforalt) individuals were found to have harbored ~65% West Eurasian-like ancestry and considered likely direct descendants of such "Basal Eurasian" population. However they were shown to be genetically closer to Holocene-era Iranians and Levantine populations, which already harbored increased archaic (Neanderthal) admixture.

Early European Farmers (EEFs), who had some Western European Hunter-Gatherer-related ancestry and originated in the Near East, also derive approximately 30% (to up to 44%) of their ancestry from this hypothetical Basal Eurasian lineage. An Upper Paleolithic specimen from Kotias Klde cave in the Caucasus (Caucasus_25,000BP) had around 24% Basal Eurasian and 76% Upper Paleolithic European ancestry.

Among modern populations, Basal-like ancestry peaks among Arabs (such as Qataris) at c. 45%, and among Iranian populations at c. 35%, and is also found in significant amounts among modern Northern Africans, in accordance with the high affinity towards the 'Arabian branch' of Eurasian diversity, which expanded into Northern and Northeastern Africa between 30 and 15 thousand years ago. Modern populations of the Levant derive between 35-38% ancestry from Basal Eurasians, modern Anatolians and populations from the Caucasus derive between 25-30% ancestry from Basal Eurasians, and modern Europeans derive around or less than 20% ancestry from Basal Eurasians.

Modern Bedouins and Yemenis are considered to represent direct descendants of the Basal Eurasians, carrying the highest amount of indigenous 'Arabian ancestry', and being basal to all modern Eurasian populations without displaying higher 'African-associated' admixture, and thus "are among the best genetic representatives of the autochthonous population on the Arabian Peninsula".

== See also ==
- Genetic history of the Middle East
- Genetic history of North Africa
- Genetic history of Europe

== Sources ==
- Bergström, Anders; Stringer, Chris; Hajdinjak, Mateja; Scerri, Eleanor M. L.; Skoglund, Pontus (11 February 2021). "Origins of modern human ancestry". Nature. 590 (7845): 229–237. Bibcode:2021Natur.590..229B. doi:10.1038/s41586-021-03244-5. ISSN 0028-0836. PMID 33568824. S2CID 231883210.
- Ferreira, Joana C.; Alshamali, Farida; Montinaro, Francesco; Cavadas, Bruno; Torroni, Antonio; Pereira, Luisa; Raveane, Alessandro; Fernandes, Veronica (1 September 2021). "Projecting Ancient Ancestry in Modern-Day Arabians and Iranians: A Key Role of the Past Exposed Arabo-Persian Gulf on Human Migrations". Genome Biology and Evolution. 13 (9) evab194. doi:10.1093/gbe/evab194. ISSN 1759-6653. PMC 8435661. PMID 34480555.
- Fu, Qiaomei; et al. (2016). "The genetic history of Ice Age Europe". Nature. 534 (7606): 200–205. Bibcode:2016Natur.534..200F. doi:10.1038/nature17993. hdl:10211.3/198594. PMC 4943878. PMID 27135931.
- Kamm, Jack; Terhorst, Jonathan; Durbin, Richard; Song, Yun S. (2 July 2020). "Efficiently Inferring the Demographic History of Many Populations With Allele Count Data". Journal of the American Statistical Association. 115 (531): 1472–1487. doi:10.1080/01621459.2019.1635482. ISSN 0162-1459. PMC 7531012. PMID 33012903.
- Lazaridis, Iosif; Patterson, Nick; Mittnik, Alissa; Renaud, Gabriel; Mallick, Swapan; Kirsanow, Karola; Sudmant, Peter H.; Schraiber, Joshua G.; Castellano, Sergi; Lipson, Mark; Berger, Bonnie; Economou, Christos; Bollongino, Ruth; Fu, Qiaomei; Bos, Kirsten I. (2014). "Ancient human genomes suggest three ancestral populations for present-day Europeans". Nature. 513 (7518): 409–413. arXiv:1312.6639. Bibcode:2014Natur.513..409L. doi:10.1038/nature13673. ISSN 0028-0836. PMC 4170574. PMID 25230663.
- Lazaridis, Iosif; et al. (2016). "Genomic insights into the origin of farming in the ancient Near East" (PDF). Nature. 536 (7617): 419–424. Bibcode:2016Natur.536..419L. doi:10.1038/nature19310. PMC 5003663. PMID 27459054.
- Lazaridis, Iosif (2018). "The evolutionary history of human populations in Europe". Current Opinion in Genetics & Development. 53: 21–27. arXiv:1805.01579. doi:10.1016/j.gde.2018.06.007. PMID 29960127. S2CID 19158377.
- Vallini, Leonardo; Pagani, Luca (2022). "The future of the Eurasian past: highlighting plotholes and pillars of human population movements in the Late Pleistocene". Journal of Anthropological Sciences. 100 (100): 231–241. doi:10.4436/JASS.10013. ISSN 1827-4765. PMID 36565457.
- van de Loosdrecht, Marieke; Bouzouggar, Abdeljalil; Humphrey, Louise; Posth, Cosimo; Barton, Nick; Aximu-Petri, Ayinuer; Nickel, Birgit; Nagel, Sarah; Talbi, El Hassan; El Hajraoui, Mohammed Abdeljalil; Amzazi, Saaïd; Hublin, Jean-Jacques; Pääbo, Svante; Schiffels, Stephan; Meyer, Matthias (2018). "Pleistocene North African genomes link Near Eastern and sub-Saharan African human populations". Science. 360 (6388): 548–552. Bibcode:2018Sci...360..548V. doi:10.1126/science.aar8380. ISSN 0036-8075. PMID 29545507. S2CID 206666517.
- Wang CC, Reinhold S, Kalmykov A, et al. (4 February 2019). "Ancient human genome-wide data from a 3000-year interval in the Caucasus corresponds with eco-geographic regions". Nat Commun. 10 (1) 590. Bibcode:2019NatCo..10..590W. doi:10.1038/s41467-018-08220-8. PMC 6360191. PMID 30713341.
