= Satsurblia Cave =

Cave and archaeological site in Georgia

Satsurblia Cave Natural Monument
- IUCN category III (natural monument or feature)
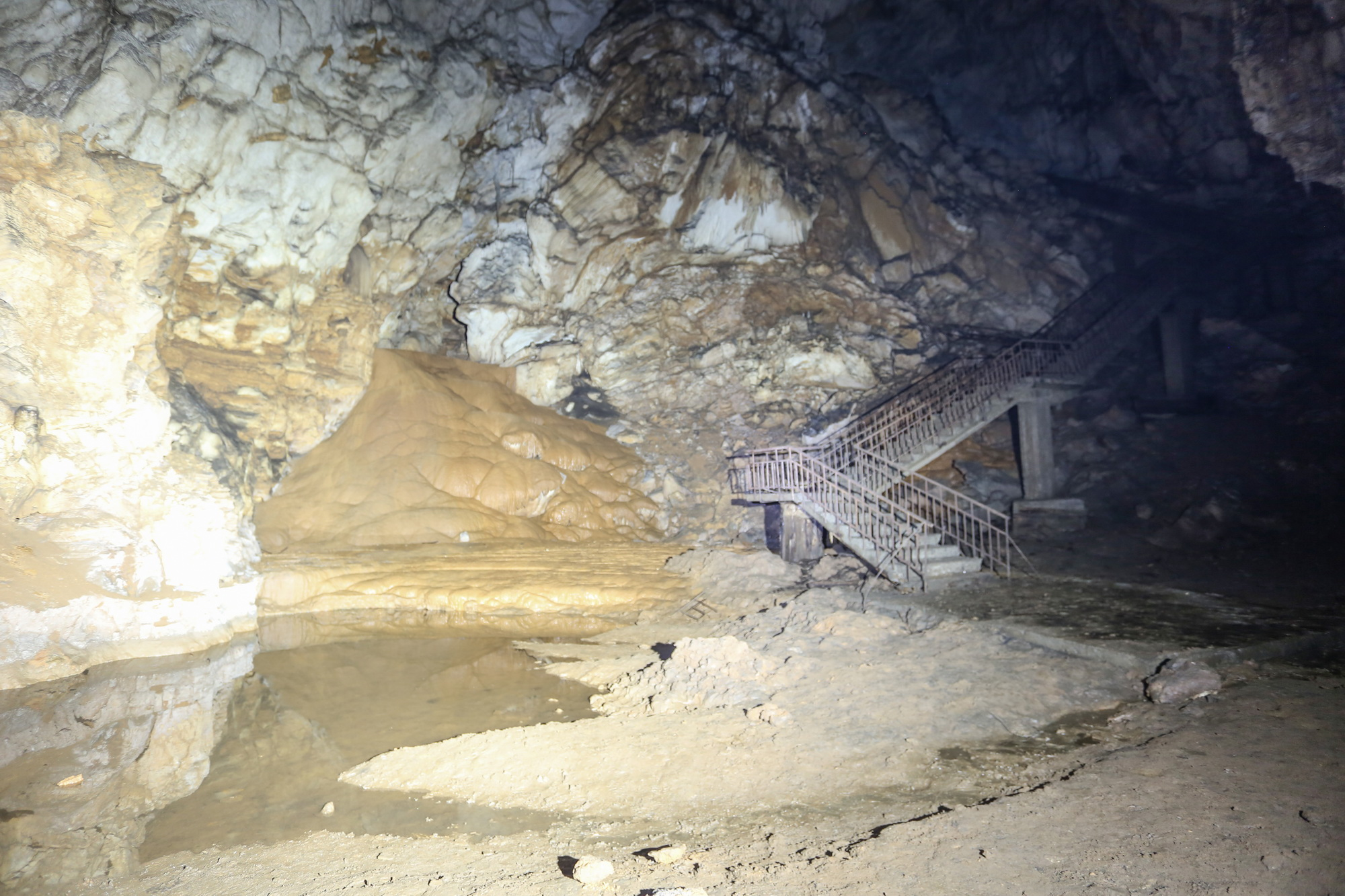
- Inside Satsurblia Cave

- Location within Georgia Location within Imereti
- Nearest city: Tsqaltubo
- Coordinates: 42°23′17.2″N 42°36′22.2″E
- Area: 0.01 km^{2} (0.0039 sq mi)
- Established: 2011
- Governing body: Agency of Protected Areas
- Website: საწურბლიას მღვიმის ბუნების ძეგლი

Satsurblia Cave
- Location in Georgia Satsurblia Cave (Imereti)
- 42°23′17.2″N 42°36′22.2″E
- Type: karst cave
- Periods: Late Upper Paleolithic
- Region: Sataplia-Tskaltubo karst massif

Site notes
- Elevation: 360 m (1,180 ft)
- Length: 125 m (410 ft)
- Excavation dates: 1976, 1985–88, 1989–1992, 2008–2010, 2012–2013
- Archaeologists: A. N. Kalandadze, T. Meshveliani

Satsurblia Cave Natural Monument (Georgian: საწურბლიას მღვიმე [s̪ät͡sʼuɾbɫiäs̪ mɣʷime̞]) is a paleoanthropological site located 1.2 km from Kumistavi village, Tsqaltubo Municipality, in the Imereti region of Georgia, 287 meters above sea level. The karst cave was first excavated in 1976 by A. N. Kalandadze. In the Middle Ages the cave was used as a refuge.

== Morphology ==
Satsurblia Cave is a karst cave, formed in the Sataphlia-Tskaltubo karst massif. The cave has many stalactites, stalagmites, travertines and large gourds of limestone. The entrance to the cave is six meter wide. The first cave tunnel is 80 m long and has 12 to 150-degree slope. The tunnel evolves into steps of 1 - 1.5 m height. At 125 meters from the entrance there is a five meter thick flat plate in a large hall measured 30 meters by 25 meters.

== Fauna ==
The inhabitants of the cave are Plutomurus and Oxychilus.

== Archaeology ==
Prehistoric people first occupied the cave from around 25,500 to 24,400 BP. The next period of human occupation at Satsurblia took place from around 17,000 to 16,200 BP. The hiatus in human occupation at Satsurblia coincides with the Last Glacial Maximum.

Lithic artefacts, bone artefacts, charcoal, flax fibers, and pottery were discovered at the cave. The lithic artefacts show similarities to eastern Epigravettian sites. Perforated pendants made out of stalagmite and polished bovid bone were also discovered. The remains of yellow, red and brown ochre were also found at the site.

Unlike most other Paleolithic sites found in Georgia that relied primarily on hunting one species, the people of Satsurblia appeared to have hunted a slightly more diverse range of species. The animal remains found at Satsurblia were dominated primarily by wild boar, followed by red deer; the remains of aurochs, steppe bison, Capra caucasica, and roe deer were also found. Some brown bear, wolf, fox, and Eurasian beaver remains were also found at the site.

== Genetics ==
In 2013, archaeologists found a temporal bone fragment of an ancient human in the cave. Direct AMS dating of the bone yielded an estimated date of 13,300 BP for the age of the bone. Researchers successfully extracted DNA from the petrous part of the temporal bone and managed to recover low coverage genomes.

The ancient individual from Satsurblia was male with black hair and brown eyes; however, the individual is one of the earliest found to carry the derived HERC2 allele for blue eyes. The Satsurblia individual also likely had light skin, as he was found to carry the derived SLC24A5 allele for light skin. The Satsurblia individual was also lactose intolerant and did not carry the derived EDAR allele commonly found in East Asians and Native Americans.

The Satsurblia individual belongs to mtDNA Haplogroup K3 and Y-DNA Haplogroup J1-Y6313*. About 1.7-2.4% of the Satsurblia individual's DNA was Neanderthal in origin.

=== Caucasus hunter-gatherers ===
The Satsurblia individual is genetically closest to an ancient individual, dating to around 9,700 BP, found at the Kotias Klde rock shelter in Georgia. Together, they form a genetically distinct cluster referred to as Caucasus Hunter-Gatherer (CHG).

In comparison to modern human populations, the Satsurblia individual is closest to the modern population in Georgia.

The Caucasus hunter-gatherers contributed significantly to modern European populations by way of the Yamnaya people. Around half of the Yamnaya people's DNA come from the Caucasus hunter-gatherers, with the other half being derived from Eastern Hunter Gatherers. The Caucasus hunter-gatherers also contributed genetically to modern Central Asians and South Asians.

== See also ==
- Prehistoric Georgia
- Tsutskhvati Cave Natural Monument

== Bibliography ==
- Fu, Qiaomei; Posth, Cosimo; et al. (May 2, 2016). "The genetic history of Ice Age Europe". Nature. 534 (7606): 200–205. Bibcode:2016Natur.534..200F. doi:10.1038/nature17993. hdl:10211.3/198594. PMC 4943878. PMID 27135931.
- Martkoplishvili, Inga (2015). "Some popular medicinal plants and diseases of the Upper Palaeolithic in Western Georgia". Journal of Ethnopharmacology. 166: 42–52. doi:10.1016/j.jep.2015.03.003. PMID 25769538.
- Jones, Eppie R.; et al. (2015). "Upper Palaeolithic genomes reveal deep roots of modern Eurasians". Nature Communications. 6: 8912. Bibcode:2015NatCo...6.8912J. doi:10.1038/ncomms9912. PMC 4660371. PMID 26567969.
- Pinhasi, Ron; et al. (2014). "Satsurblia: New Insights of Human Response and Survival across the Last Glacial Maximum in the Southern Caucasus". PLOS ONE. 9 (10) e111271. Bibcode:2014PLoSO...9k1271P. doi:10.1371/journal.pone.0111271. PMC 4213019. PMID 25354048.
- Chataigner, Christine (October 30, 2024). "The South Caucasus from the Upper Palaeolithic to the Neolithic: Intersection of the genetic and archaeological data". Quaternary Science Reviews. 345. Bibcode:2024QSRv..34509061C. doi:10.1016/j.quascirev.2024.109061 – via Elsevier Science Direct.
