= Middle Paleolithic in Georgia (country) =

Middle Paleolithic archaeology of Georgia

The Middle Paleolithic in Georgia is conventionally dated from approximately 260,000 to 40,000 years ago. Its best-documented archaeological record consists mainly of cave and rockshelter sequences in western Georgia, especially in the Rioni–Qvirila basin, with a smaller and less securely dated record in the east and south. The earliest well-dated sequence is at Djruchula Cave, while late Middle Paleolithic occupations are documented at sites such as Ortvala Klde, Bondi Cave, Ortvala Cave, and Sakajia.

The stone-tool assemblages are generally described as Mousterian, but they vary substantially in reduction methods and tool forms. Levallois, discoidal, laminar, and occasional bifacial methods occur in different combinations. Parallels with the Levant, the Zagros, and the Iranian Plateau have been interpreted by archaeologists as suggesting wider regional relationships alongside the persistence of local technological traditions.

As of 2026, Neanderthals are the only hominins identified from Georgia's Middle Paleolithic contexts. Their remains are fragmentary, and none has been directly dated. The Middle-to-Upper Paleolithic transition varied between the documented sequences. At sites such as Ortvala Klde and Bondi Cave, Middle Paleolithic occupations were followed by technologically distinct Early Upper Paleolithic assemblages without recognized transitional industries. Earlier chronological studies interpreted apparent gaps between the two traditions as evidence that modern humans arrived after Neanderthals had disappeared, with little or no opportunity for interaction. Revised dating at Ortvala Klde, together with later Middle Paleolithic dates from Sakajia and Ortvala Cave, has reopened discussion of possible overlap, but the absence of securely associated hominin remains leaves the question unresolved.

== Lower Paleolithic background ==
Georgia has one of the earliest archaeological records outside Africa. At Dmanisi, stone artifacts occur in deposits dated to approximately 1.85–1.78 million years ago, and hominin fossils date to about 1.77 million years ago. The simple core-and-flake technology is comparable to the Oldowan. The long interval between Dmanisi and the later Lower Paleolithic is incompletely documented. Acheulean assemblages, including bifaces and other large cutting tools, are known from sites such as Kudaro and Tsona, although the chronology and integrity of some older collections remain uncertain.

Technological continuity between the Georgian Acheulean and early Middle Paleolithic has been proposed, particularly in laminar reduction, but Georgian evidence does not presently provide a continuous, securely dated stratigraphic sequence across the transition. At Nor Geghi in neighboring Armenia, bifacial and Levallois technologies occur together in deposits dated to approximately 335,000–325,000 years ago, providing regional evidence that the two methods could coexist during the transition.

== Climate and environment ==
The Georgian Middle Paleolithic spans several glacial–interglacial cycles, during which climate and vegetation varied across both time and space. In western Georgia, extensive limestone massifs dissected by the Rioni and Qvirila river systems contained numerous caves. The Qvirila valley provided abundant flint. Pollen, faunal, and geomorphological evidence indicates a varied environmental mosaic rather than a uniformly open glacial landscape. Even during Late Pleistocene cold phases, the foothills and lowlands included forests, open grasslands, mountain steppe, and wetlands, and at times retained comparatively mild and humid, refugium-like conditions. Glaciers expanded at higher elevations and vegetation distributions shifted, probably complicating movement through the mountains without preventing access to river valleys or the occupation of caves.

A phytolith study at Ortvala Klde provides a more local perspective, reconstructing vegetation between approximately 60,000 and 25,000 years ago. Woody plants and herbaceous eudicots remained prominent across the late Middle-to-early Upper Paleolithic sequence, indicating relative vegetation stability around the rockshelter despite wider climatic fluctuations. The study concluded that the technological transition at the site was not predicated on regional environmental change.

== Archaeological record ==
Selected Middle Paleolithic archaeological localities in Georgia. Numbers identify locations, not chronological order.
1. Djruchula Cave; 2. Ortvala Klde; 3. Bondi Cave; 4. Ortvala Cave; 5. Sakajia; 6. Tsutskhvati cave complex; 7. Tsopi.

=== Early Middle Paleolithic ===
Of the many cave assemblages assigned to the Middle Paleolithic principally on typological grounds, only a few Georgian sites have reliable numerical dates. Djruchula Cave in the Qvirila basin contains the earliest securely dated Middle Paleolithic sequence in Georgia.

At Djruchula, two archaeological units are separated by roughly one meter of largely sterile deposits. Thermoluminescence dating of heated flint places the lower occupation phase at approximately 260,000–210,000 years ago and the upper phase near 140,000 years ago, leaving a long chronological interval between them. Both assemblages combine Levallois reduction with volumetric laminar production and include blades, elongated points, scrapers, and denticulates. The assemblages have been compared with early blade-producing Middle Paleolithic industries in the Levant.

Tsopi, a collapsed cave in southeastern Georgia, is another possible early Middle Paleolithic locality, but its chronology and classification remain unresolved. The 1950s excavations identified five Middle Paleolithic occupational horizons, although the published material and surviving collection lack stratigraphic attribution. The assemblage includes Levallois and Quina elements, heavily retouched transverse scrapers, backed knives, and bifacial tools. Comparisons with the Yabrudian, Charentian, and Micoquian remain provisional because the material is incomplete and has limited chronological information.

=== Other stratified sequences ===
The multi-level karst system at Tsutskhvati contains several caves with Middle Paleolithic deposits. At Bronze Cave, renewed excavations produced a revised stratigraphic sequence and identified Middle Paleolithic layers dating to more than 45,000 years ago. The assemblages use Levallois and discoidal reduction and include points, scrapers, denticulates, and notches. Faunal remains include bovids, deer, caprines, and abundant cave bear; cut marks, carnivore damage, and burned bones indicate a complex accumulation history involving both humans and other animals. A Neanderthal permanent incisor recovered from the renewed excavations adds to the fragmentary human fossil record of the complex.

Ormagi Ekhi preserves a stratified sequence of repeated occupations spanning part of the interval between Djruchula and the better-known late sites. Its oldest dated archaeological layer is approximately 90,000 years old and contains a large-blade component. Refitting and manufacturing debris show that some stone production occurred inside the cave. Ungulate bones—principally Caucasian tur, steppe bison, and red deer—bear fractures and butchery marks; some bones were burned.

=== Late Middle Paleolithic ===
Several of the best-dated late Middle Paleolithic sequences are in western Georgia. At Bondi Cave, Middle Paleolithic occupations date to approximately 45,000 calibrated years before present (cal BP). They are separated from the overlying Upper Paleolithic sequence by a block-fall deposit and an apparent chronological hiatus, and no transitional Middle-to-Upper Paleolithic features were identified.

Sakajia and nearby Ortvala Cave contain some of the latest reported Middle Paleolithic dates in Georgia. New excavations found that Sakajia layers I and II had been mixed by post-depositional human disturbance, making earlier dates from Layer IIb unreliable as precise markers for the Upper Paleolithic. Sakajia Layer IIIb has nevertheless been dated to approximately 39,200–37,700 cal BP, while a sample from the base of Ortvala Layer II yielded an age of approximately 40,700–39,700 cal BP.

Ortvala Klde preserves the most detailed late Middle-to-Early Upper Paleolithic sequence in the Caucasus. Its Middle Paleolithic assemblages are dominated by recurrent Levallois reduction, while faunal evidence documents the hunting of Caucasian tur and steppe bison. A revised Bayesian chronology places the end of the Middle Paleolithic between approximately 47,500 and 44,200 cal BP and the beginning of the Early Upper Paleolithic between approximately 46,700 and 43,600 cal BP. Although the modeled ranges overlap statistically, stratigraphic, archaeological, and taphonomic evidence indicates an occupational hiatus whose duration remains uncertain.

== Stone-tool industries and regional relationships ==
Middle Paleolithic stone tools at the Georgian National Museum

Georgian Middle Paleolithic assemblages are generally classified as Mousterian. Older research divided them into four named regional or typological facies: the Tsopi, Tsutskhvati, Tskhinvali, and Djruchula–Kudaro groups. Later technological studies identified greater variability and proposed several techno-types. Levallois, discoidal, unidirectional, and volumetric laminar reduction, together with occasional bifacial shaping or retouch, occur in different combinations and proportions between sites and within some cave sequences. Moncel and colleagues describe laminar production as a sporadic regional trend through time rather than a feature confined to one chronological phase.

The observed variation has been related to chronology, activities conducted at particular sites, ecological conditions, regional traditions, and external influences. Assemblages containing blades or elongated points have been compared with material from the Levant and Zagros. At Ormagi Ekhi, the oldest assemblage is dominated by Levallois reduction and includes large blades, while younger layers combine flake, discoidal, Levallois, and lamino-lamellar methods. The older assemblage has also been compared technologically with substantially earlier laminar industries in the Levant and Iranian Plateau; its investigators describe these similarities as affinities and potential southern links alongside the persistence of local traditions.

Most assemblages were manufactured primarily from locally available flint or argillite. Cores, cortical pieces, flakes, maintenance products, and production debris indicate that knapping took place inside several caves. Obsidian is much rarer in western Georgian Middle Paleolithic contexts: only three specimens, representing two compositional groups, have been documented at Ortvala Klde. Their provenance indicates long-distance raw-material transport, although the small sample and uncertain attribution of some source areas limit broader interpretation.

== Subsistence and settlement ==
Faunal assemblages document the hunting and processing of medium and large ungulates. At Ortvala Klde, Caucasian tur dominated the Middle Paleolithic assemblages and steppe bison was also important; mortality profiles and seasonality evidence point to systematic hunting. At Ormagi Ekhi, the principal ungulates were Caucasian tur, steppe bison, and red deer. Fresh-bone fractures, butchery marks, and burning indicate that humans accumulated and processed the ungulate remains. Cave bears also used the cave for hibernation, while there is no evidence that other carnivores used it as a den.

The intensity and character of occupation varied between sites and through time. Low-density assemblages at some caves are consistent with short or occasional visits, whereas stratified sequences such as Ormagi Ekhi record repeated occupations and changes in activities.

== Human remains ==
Known human remains from Georgian Middle Paleolithic contexts have been attributed to Neanderthals. They include a partial maxilla, reported skull fragments, and an isolated lower molar from Sakajia, together with isolated teeth from Bronze Cave, Djruchula, Ortvala Klde, and Ortvala Cave. None of these fossils has been dated directly; their chronological placement derives from the archaeological layers and associated deposits in which they were found.

The association of diagnostic fossils with Middle Paleolithic assemblages identifies Neanderthal occupation at those sites. At sites lacking diagnostic human remains, however, stone-tool assemblages alone cannot be assigned confidently to a particular hominin population. Archaeological dates for the end of Middle Paleolithic occupations have therefore been used as indirect estimates, rather than direct fossil dates, for the latest Neanderthal presence.

== End of the Middle Paleolithic ==
Available dates do not place the end of the Middle Paleolithic at the same time in every Georgian sequence. Revised modeling places its end at Ortvala Klde between approximately 47,500 and 44,200 cal BP, whereas younger Middle Paleolithic occupations are dated to approximately 40,700–39,700 cal BP at Ortvala Cave and 39,200–37,700 cal BP at Sakajia. Comparisons remain limited by the small number of securely dated sites and by chronological and stratigraphic problems in some sequences.

At Ortvala Klde, the Early Upper Paleolithic stone and bone technologies have no identified technological roots in the preceding Middle Paleolithic assemblages. Stratigraphic, taphonomic, and chronological evidence indicates an occupational hiatus, interpreted as a likely local Middle Paleolithic population vacuum before the appearance of the Early Upper Paleolithic. This site-specific evidence does not establish a single demographic process throughout Georgia. The earlier presence of the Upper Paleolithic at Ortvala Klde, alongside later Middle Paleolithic occupations at Sakajia and Ortvala Cave, has renewed discussion of possible overlap or interaction between Neanderthals and modern humans. The absence of hominin remains from many of the relevant assemblages leaves this question unresolved.
