= Godogani, Imereti =

Godogani გოდოგანი
- Village
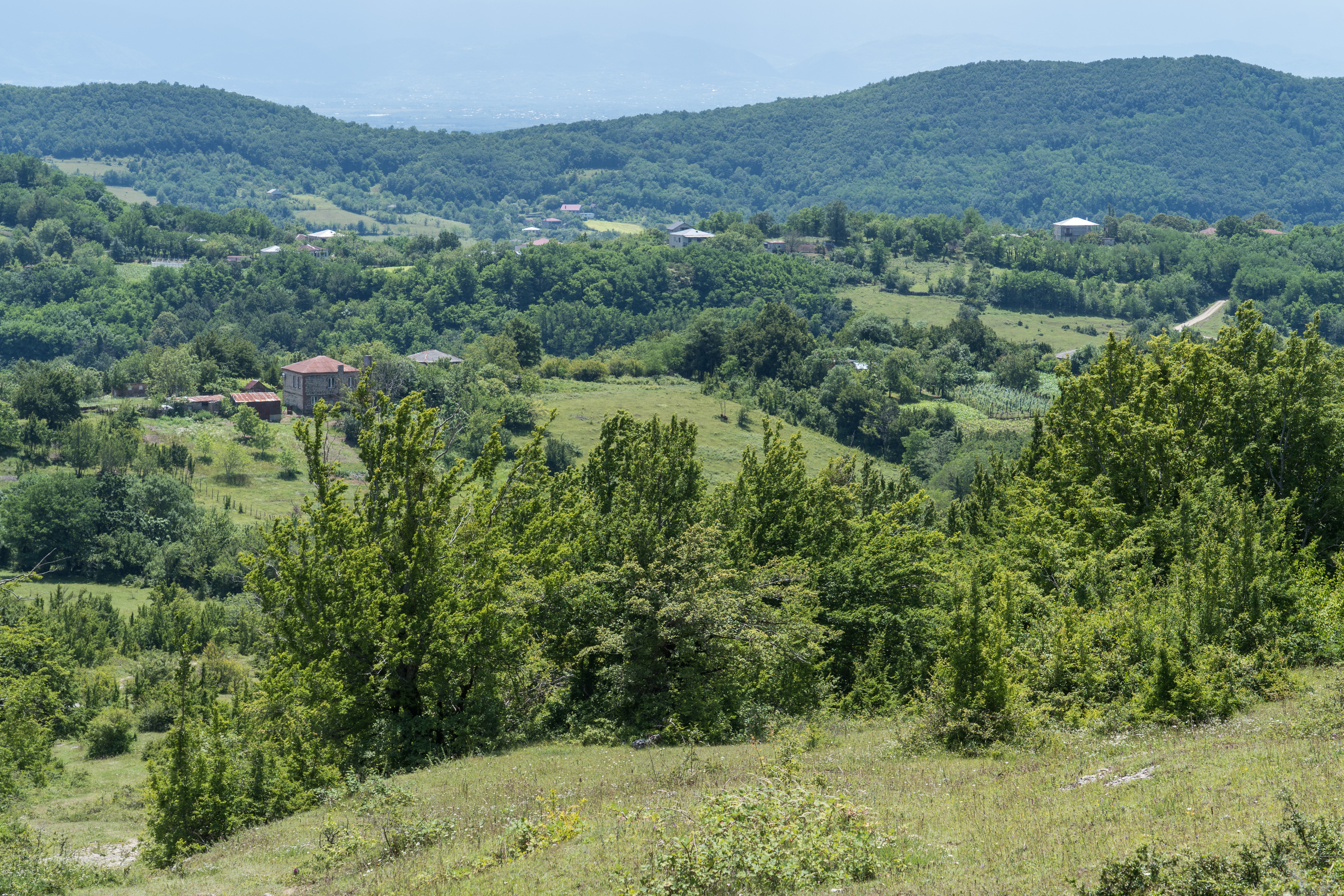
- Godogani Village

- Location of Godogani in Georgia Godogani (Imereti)
- Coordinates: 42°15′34″N 42°46′54″E
- Country: Georgia
- Region: Imereti
- District: Terjola

Population (2014)
  - Total: 1,462
- Time zone: UTC+4 (Georgian Time)

Godogani (Georgian: გოდოგანი) is a village in Terjola Municipality, Imereti, in west-central Georgia. It is the location of the Sakazhia Cave Natural Monument.
