= Tsutskhvati Cave Natural Monument =

Karst cave complex and archaeological site in Georgia

- Maghara
- IUCN category III (natural monument or feature)
- Location in Georgia Tsutskhvati (Imereti)
- Location: Tsutskhvati, Tkibuli Municipality, Imereti, Georgia
- Nearest city: Kutaisi
- Coordinates: 42°16′14.94″N 42°51′09.90″E
- Elevation: 320 metres (1,050 ft)
- Established: 2007
- Governing body: Agency of Protected Areas
- Website: apa.gov.ge

Tsutskhvati Cave Natural Monument (Georgian: ცუცხვათის მღვიმოვანის ბუნების ძეგლი), locally known as Maghara (Georgian: მაღარა), is a multilevel karst cave complex and protected natural monument near the village of Tsutskhvati in Tkibuli Municipality, Imereti, western Georgia. The system is developed in limestone of the Okriba karst massif and comprises a large active passage and numerous dry caves arranged at different elevations. It was designated by the Georgian government as part of the Imereti Caves Protected Areas in 2007.

Tsutskhvati is home to an important archaeological complex. Excavated cavities including Bronze Cave, Ormagi Ekhi, Bison Cave, Bear Cave, and Upper Cave preserve evidence of repeated use from the Middle Paleolithic onward. Bronze Cave has yielded Mousterian and Upper Paleolithic deposits, two teeth attributed to Neanderthals, and later Chalcolithic material. Ormagi Ekhi preserves a long Middle Paleolithic sequence extending from approximately 90,000 years ago to more than 40,000 years ago.

== Karst system and natural features ==
The complex lies south of the village of Tsutskhvati in the Chishura River River valley, a tributary basin of the Qvirila. The natural monument is recorded at approximately 320 metres (1,050 ft), while its named archaeological caves occupy several elevations within the limestone massif. Several phases of cave formation have been identified, and ongoing research has used topographic and laser-scanning data to investigate the development of the karst system and its sediment fills.

The cave complex has thirteen levels. The lowest contains a narrow active passage carrying the Shabataghele stream, known downstream as the Chishura. The second level is dominated by a natural tunnel about 200 metres (660 ft) long, 10–30 metres (33–98 ft) wide, and 10–28 metres (33–92 ft) high. Water enters this passage during floods; its branches contain springs, a small lake, and calcite deposits. From the fourth level upward, the cavities are generally dry and include most of the known archaeological localities.

The complex supports bats and a varied subterranean invertebrate fauna. Recorded groups include cave beetles, springtails, mites, spiders, and millipedes; several species in the biological inventory are associated with the Okriba karst.

== Archaeological research ==
The name "Tsutskhvati cave complex" refers to a group of separate cavities within the multilevel karst system, including Bison Cave (Bizonis Mghvime) at an elevation of about 290 metres (950 ft), Bronze Cave (Brinjaos Mghvime) at 300 metres (980 ft), and Upper Cave (Zeda Mghvime) at 350 metres (1,150 ft), as well as Bear Cave (Datvebis Mghvime). All four yielded Middle Paleolithic assemblages classified as Mousterian. Bronze Cave also contains Upper Paleolithic and later prehistoric deposits.

Systematic archaeological excavations began under Davit M. Tushabramishvili in 1970. Bison, Bronze, and Bear caves were investigated from 1970 to 1971, while work at Upper Cave took place in 1971 and 1974. Excavations at Bronze Cave continued from 1974 to 1978 and from 1993 to 1994. These campaigns recovered stone artifacts, animal bones, and a deciduous human molar from Bronze Cave; the artifacts are held by the Georgian National Museum.

Ormagi Ekhi (literally, "double cave") was investigated in the periods of 1970–1975, 1998–1999, and 2002. An interdisciplinary work at Tsutskhvati, launched in 2016, concentrated on Bronze Cave and Ormagi Ekhi. It employed revised stratigraphic recording, radiocarbon and optically stimulated luminescence dating, and analyses of stone tools, fauna, sediments, and spatial distributions. At Bronze Cave, the new excavations identified 25 lithological layers.

== Archaeological record ==
=== Bronze Cave ===
Bronze Cave contains Middle and Upper Paleolithic deposits beneath later prehistoric layers. Radiocarbon measurements places its uppermost Middle Paleolithic layer beyond 44,100 radiocarbon years before present and the underlying layers beyond 48,500 or 50,000 years. The dated animal bones indicate that the Middle Paleolithic deposits are older than approximately 46,000 calibrated years before present.

Under the stratigraphy established by the 2016–2020 excavations, layers XVI–XXV belong to the Middle Paleolithic and layers IX–XIV to the Upper Paleolithic. The Upper Paleolithic occupations date to approximately 35,500–30,200 calibrated years ago. Their stone industry includes prismatic blade and bladelet production; hearths and butchered animal bones indicate short-term episodes of occupation.

The Middle Paleolithic assemblages include points, scrapers, denticulates, and notched tools produced mainly through Levallois and discoidal reduction. Burned and cut-marked bones occur with the artifacts, and bison, deer, caprines, and cave bear are represented in the faunal assemblage.

Two human teeth have been reported from the Middle Paleolithic deposits. A fragmentary deciduous lower molar recovered during the earlier excavations was attributed to a Neanderthal but could not be directly dated; it came from the uppermost Middle Paleolithic unit. The renewed excavation recovered a permanent incisor attributed to a Neanderthal from layer XIX.

=== Ormagi Ekhi ===
Ormagi Ekhi preserves more than 4.5 metres (15 ft) of deposits and evidence of repeated Middle Paleolithic occupations. Radiocarbon samples from its upper archaeological layers are more than 40,000 years old, while luminescence dating places occupations at approximately 50,000–60,000 years ago, more than 70,000 years ago, and around 90,000 years ago.

The approximately 90,000-year-old layer contains a Levallois assemblage with large blades and elongated points. Younger layers combine flake, discoidal, Levallois, and lamino-lamellar production. Stone-tool manufacture took place in the cave, and fractured, cut-marked, and burned ungulate bones record the processing of Caucasian tur, steppe bison, and red deer. Cave bears also used the cavity for hibernation.

=== Later occupation ===
Bronze Cave was used again after the Paleolithic. Handmade pottery, flint artifacts, bone tools, and animal remains from its upper deposits led researchers to identify a Chalcolithic occupation. The cave could have served as a temporary or permanent shelter during the 6th to 7th millennia BC.

The higher parts of the system also preserve evidence of later use such as mortared walls, rock-cut steps, and fragments of large ceramic vessels in three cavities used defensively during the Middle Ages.
