= Godogani, Samegrelo-Zemo Svaneti =

Godogani გოდოგანი
- Village
- Location of Godogani in Georgia Godogani (Samegrelo-Zemo Svaneti)
- Coordinates: 42°34′43″N 42°16′03″E
- Country: Georgia
- Region: Samegrelo-Zemo Svaneti
- District: Martvili
- Elevation: 360 m (1,180 ft)

Population (2014)
  - Total: 40
- Time zone: UTC+4 (Georgian Time)

Godogani (Georgian: გოდოგანი) is a village in Martvili Municipality, Samegrelo-Zemo Svaneti, in western Georgia. It is located on the Odishi-Guria plain, on the left bank of the river Ochkhomuri, 25 km (16 mi) from Martvili.
