= Chikiani =

Volcanic mountain and prehistoric obsidian source in Georgia

Mount Chikiani
- Koyundağ
- Mount Chikiani from the northwest

Highest point
- Elevation: 2,417 m (7,930 ft)
- Coordinates: 41°28′38″N 43°51′54″E

Naming
- Native name: ჭიქიანის მთა (Georgian)

Geography
- Location in Georgia
- Location: Ninotsminda Municipality, Samtskhe–Javakheti, Georgia
- Parent range: Javakheti Range, Lesser Caucasus

Geology
- Rock age: Pliocene
- Mountain type: Volcanic dome

Mount Chikiani (Georgian: ჭიქიანის მთა, Ch'ik'ianis mta), also known locally as Koyundağ, is a volcanic mountain in southern Georgia. It rises to about 2,417 metres (7,930 ft) above sea level in the Ninotsminda Municipality, near the northeastern shore of Lake Paravani. The mountain lies in the northern Javakheti Range of the Lesser Caucasus, on the divide between the Paravani and Tsalka plateaus.

Chikiani supplied high-quality obsidian over a long period of prehistory. Artifacts chemically attributed to the source occurs in Paleolithic cave deposits in western Georgia and at Neolithic-to-Early Iron Age settlements across the South Caucasus. Surveys on the mountain have located extraction pits, knapping areas and workshops, as well as burial mounds and a menhir locally known as Tikma-Dash.

== Geography and geology ==
Chikiani is a 2,417 metres (7,930 ft)-high trachyrhyolitic dome 300 metres (980 ft) north-east of Lake Paravani. Geological dating places its acidic lava flows in the Pliocene, between about 2.8 and 2.4 million years ago. The dome includes trachyrhyolite, obsidian and perlite.

Obsidian occurs across the dome and in a substantial flow to the northeast. Much of it is homogeneous with no inclusions. Its varieties range from translucent black to banded, brown, red and green. Blocks weather from the lava and move downslope; tributaries of the Khrami River also carry obsidian away from the primary outcrops, creating secondary deposits. The source is relatively easy to reach from the plateau. The only obstacle is the thick snow covering the high ground for more than six months of the year. The modern vegetation is predominantly treeless subalpine meadow, but pollen analysis of sediments from the surroundings shows that the region was forested until at least 2000 years before present.

== Archaeology ==
Chikiani menhir photographed in 2024

Obsidian arrowheads from Mtsvane Gora as published by Erb-Satullo et al., 2023

Obsidian sourced at Chikiani was identified among artifacts from Middle Paleolithic levels at Ortvala Klde and Upper Paleolithic levels at Bondi Cave, both in western Georgia. The shortest modeled walking route from the caves to Chikiani was about 170 kilometres (110 mi). This points to direct procurement or movement through exchange networks.

Chikiani obsidian was used much more extensively from the Neolithic through the Iron Age. It has been identified at various sites across the South Caucasus. The Khrami river drainage created a natural route from the highlands toward settlements of the 6th-millennium-BC Neolithic Shulaveri–Shomu culture. At Mtsvane Gora, a fortified settlement in the lower Kura basin, most analyzed Late Bronze and Early Iron Age obsidian artifacts were also attributed to Chikiani.

Locally, archaeological surveys recorded several workshops and more than 200 clustered shallow extraction pits on Chikiani's northern and northeastern slopes. Most pits are round or oval, measure 2 to 5 metres (6.6 to 16.4 ft) across and lie between approximately 2,160 and 2,293 metres (7,087 and 7,523 ft). Excavated debris, flakes, tools and blade cores indicate that obsidian blocks were tested and knapped at or near the extraction points. Typological comparisons suggest that some workshops date to the Neolithic, while cores and tools found around the extraction features are related to the Early Bronze Age Kura–Araxes culture material.

The obsidian workings form part of a broader highland archaeological landscape on and around Chikiani. Surveys in 2016 and 2017 recorded hundreds of small stone burial mounds, including examples built partly or wholly from obsidian blocks, together with monumental kurgans, settlement remains, basalt quarries and rectilinear stone alignments up to about 110 metres (360 ft) long. Many of these features are associated with the Bronze Age, but their precise chronology remains unclear. On the lower northwestern slope, close to a group of obsidian mines, stands an uncarved menhir about 3.5 metres (11 ft) high, locally known as Tikma-Dash. Its surface has been heavily degraded.

Modern extraction has also altered the mountain. A large Soviet-era industrial obsidian quarry operated on its southern slope and perlite quarries opened in the 2010s have damaged parts of its archaeological landscape.
