= Caucasus hunter-gatherer =

Anatomically modern human genetic lineage identified in 2015

- Alternative names: Satsurblia cluster
- Geographical range: Native to Caucasus and northern parts of Iran, later in Pontic–Caspian steppe
- Period: Upper Paleolithic, Mesolithic
- Dates: 13,000–6,000 BC

Caucasus hunter-gatherer (CHG), also called Satsurblia cluster, is an anatomically modern human genetic lineage, first identified in a 2015 study, based on the population genetics of several modern Western Eurasian (European, Caucasian and Near Eastern) populations.

It represents an ancestry maximised in some Upper Paleolithic and Mesolithic hunter-gatherer groups in the Caucasus. These groups are also very closely related to Mesolithic hunter-gatherers and Neolithic farmers and pastoralists in the Iranian Plateau (Iranian hunter-gatherer cluster), who are sometimes included within the CHG group.

Ancestry that is closely related to CHG-Iranian hunter gatherers and farmers is also known from further east, including from the Bactria–Margiana Archaeological Complex and the Harappan/Indus Valley Civilisation. Caucasus hunter-gatherers and Eastern hunter-gatherers are ancestral in roughly equal proportions to the Western Steppe Herders (WSH), who were widely spread across Europe and Asia beginning during the Chalcolithic.

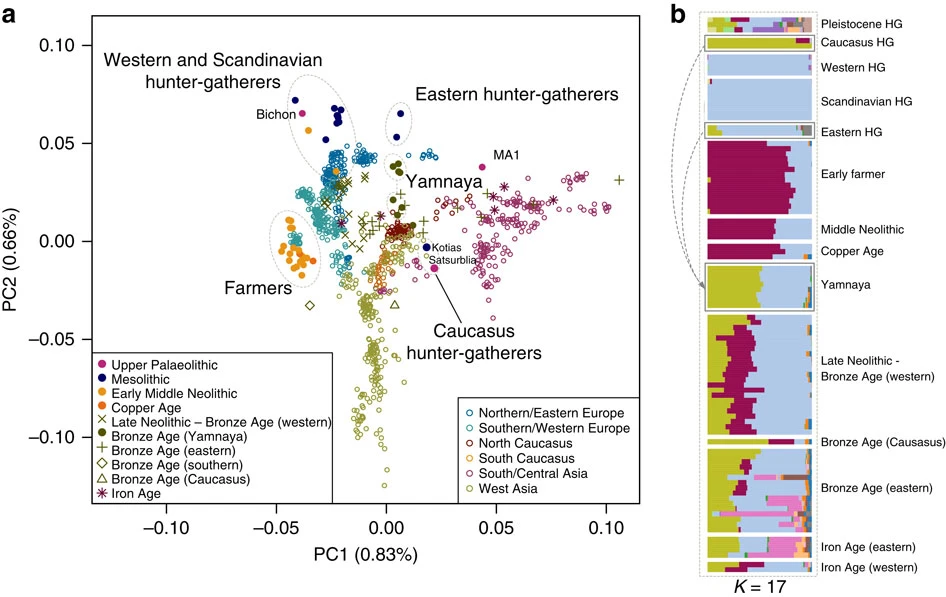
Genetic structure of ancient Europe. Caucasus hunter-gatherers are represented by the Satsurbila and Kotias specimens.

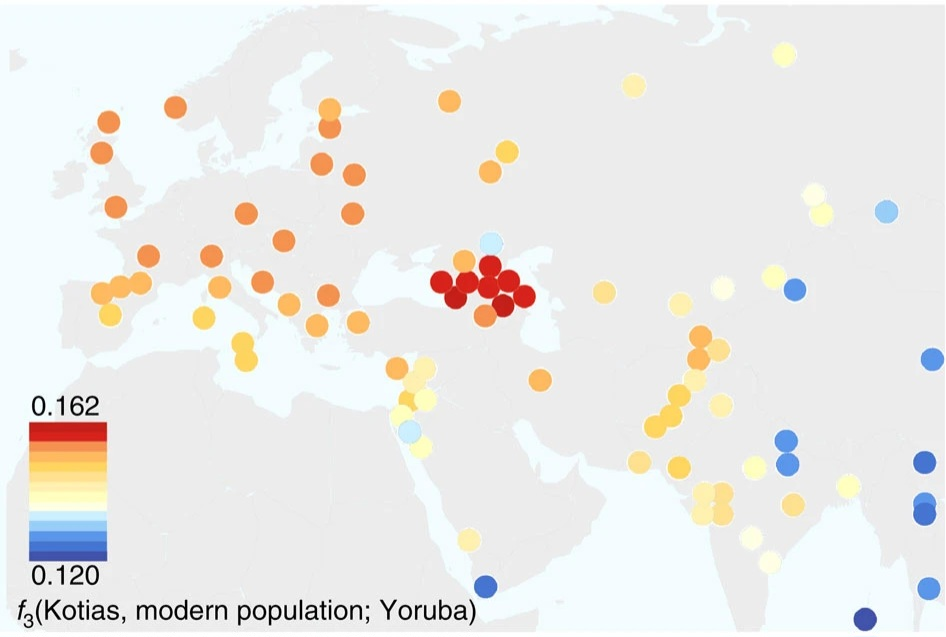
Genetic affinity of modern populations to the ancient Kotias specimen.

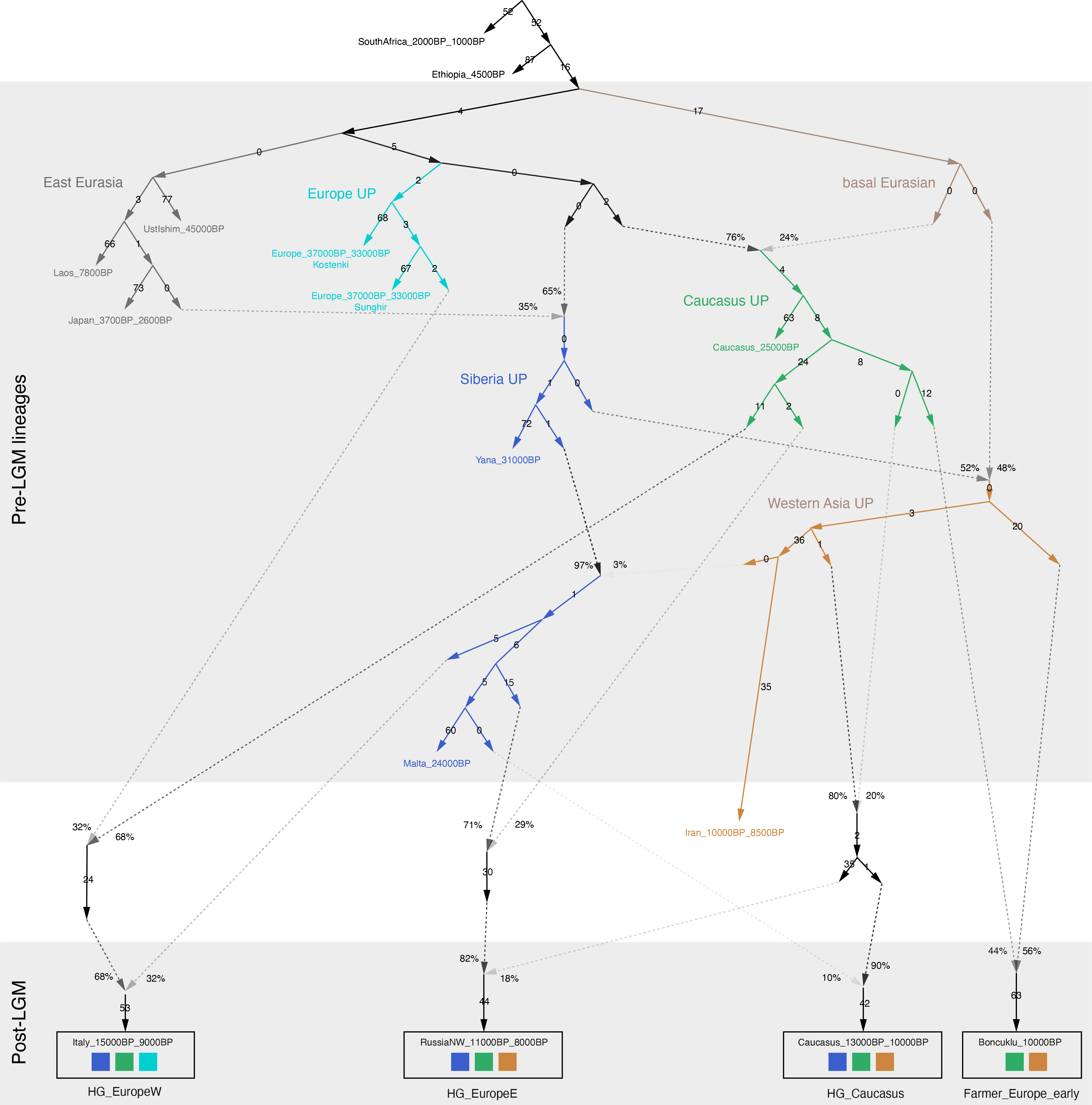
An admixture graph of deep Eurasian lineages (Allentoft et al. 2024).

== Formation and development ==
The CHG lineage is suggested to have separated from the ancestor of western hunter-gatherers (WHGs) probably during the Last Glacial Maximum (LGM, sometime between 45,000 and 26,000 years ago). They later separated from the Anatolian hunter-gatherers (AHG), suggested to around 25,000 years ago during the late LGM.

The CHG survived in isolation as a distinct population since the late LGM period, and display high genetic affinities to Mesolithic and Neolithic populations on the Iranian plateau, such as Neolithic specimens found in Ganj Dareh. The CHG have higher genetic affinities to European and Anatolian groups than do Iranian hunter-gatherers, suggesting a possible cline and geneflow into the CHG and less into Mesolithic and Neolithic Iranian groups.

One model inferred that the Mesolithic/Neolithic Iranian lineage basal to the CHG derive significant amounts of their ancestry from basal Eurasian (c. 38–48%), and the remaining ancestry (c. 52–62%) is closer to ancient north Eurasians (ANE) or eastern European hunter-gatherer (EHG). The CHG had an additional ANE-like component (c. 10%) compared to Neolithic Iranians, suggesting they may have had continuous contact with Eastern Hunter-Gatherers to their north.

The CHG also carry around 20% additional Paleolithic Caucasus/Anatolian ancestry. Lazaridis et al. (2016) models the CHG as a mixture of Neolithic Iranians, western hunter-gatherers and Eastern Hunter-Gatherers. CHG cluster with early Iranian farmers, who do not share alleles with early Levantine farmers.

An alternative model by Vallini et al. (2024) with little ANE ancestry suggests that the initial Iranian hunter-gatherer-like population which is basal to the CHG formed primarily from a deep Ancient West Eurasian lineage ('WEC2', c. 72%), and from varying degrees of ancient east Eurasian (c. 10%) and Basal Eurasian (c. 18%) components. The Ancient West Eurasian component associated with Iranian hunter-gatherers (WEC2) is inferred to have diverged from the West Eurasian Core lineage (represented by Kostenki-14; WEC), with the WEC2 component staying close to the Iranian Plateau, while the proper WEC component expanded into Europe.

Irving-Pease et al. (2024) models CHG as being derived from an Out of Africa population that split into basal Northern Europeans and West Asians. The latter was where CHG originated from.

At the beginning of the Neolithic, at c. 8000 BC, CHG were probably distributed across western Iran and the Caucasus, and similar people arrived before 6000 BC in Pakistan and north-west India. A roughly equal merger of CHG and eastern hunter-Gatherers on the Pontic–Caspian steppe created the Western Steppe Herders (WSHs). The WSHs formed the Yamnaya culture and expanded greatly throughout Europe during the Late Neolithic and Early Bronze Age c. 3000—2000 BC.

Caucasus hunter gatherer/Iranian-like ancestry, was first reported as maximized in hunter-gatherers from the South Caucasus and early herders/farmers in northwestern Iran, particularly the Zagros, hence the label "CHG/Iranian".

=== Further research ===
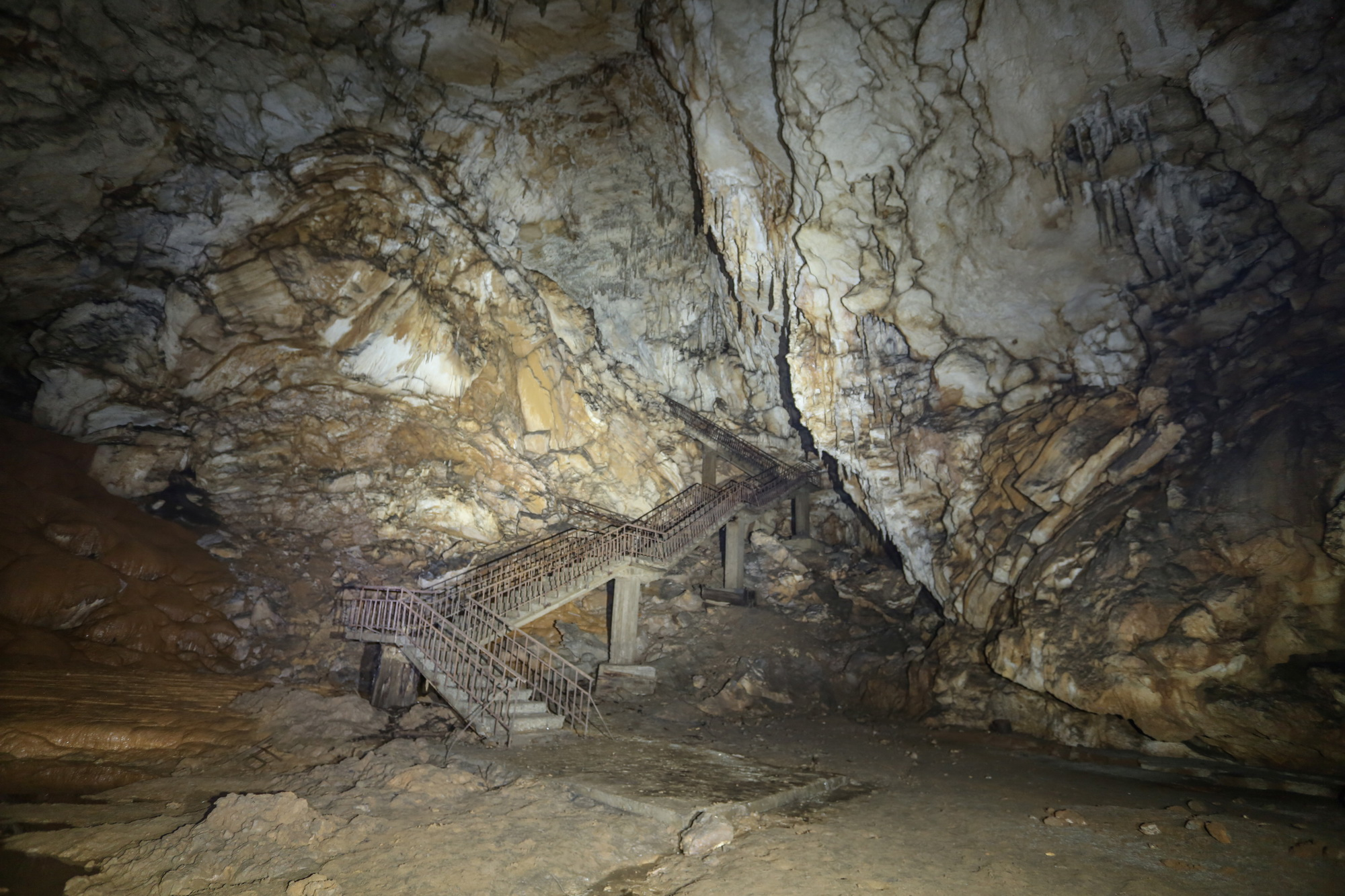
One of the Caucasus hunters was unearthed at Satsurblia cave in Georgia.

Jones et al. (2015) analyzed genomes from males from western Georgia, in the Caucasus, from the Late Upper Palaeolithic (13,300 years old) and the Mesolithic (9,700 years old). These two males carried Y-DNA haplogroup: J* and J2a, later refined to J1-FT34521, and J2-Y12379*, and mitochondrial haplogroups of K3 and H13c, respectively. Their genomes showed that a continued mixture of the Caucasians with Middle Eastern populations took place up to 25,000 years ago, when the coldest period in the last Ice Age started.

CHG ancestry was also found in an Upper Palaeolithic specimen from Satsurblia cave (dated c. 11000 BC), and in a Mesolithic one from Kotias Klde cave, in western Georgia (dated c. 7700 BC). The Satsurblia individual is closest to modern populations from the South Caucasus.

Margaryan et al. (2017) analysing South Caucasian ancient mitochondrial DNA found a rapid increase of the population at the end of the Last Glacial Maximum, about 18,000 years ago. The same study also found continuity in descent in the maternal line for 8,000 years.

According to Narasimhan et al. (2019) Iranian farmer related people arrived before 6000 BCE in Pakistan and north-west India, before the advent of farming in northern India. They suggest the possibility that this "Iranian farmer–related ancestry [...] was [also] characteristic of northern Caucasus and Iranian plateau hunter-gatherers."

According to Ghalichi et al. (2024), find that the Anatolia Neolithic to CHG-Iran_N cline formed around 6300–6000 BC, consistent with previous estimates, and the EHG–CHG cline formed around 5800–5300 BC. Interaction between Anatolia and the Caucasus increased during the Chalcolithic and the Bronze Ages, leading to the spread of CHG ancestry. It also diffused into the Mediterranean, an early indication of which is found in Anatolian farmer groups from Tepecik-Çiftlik.

Among modern populations, CHG ancestry peaks in indigenous Caucasian populations, as well as in populations that live in the east of the Caucasus, Iran and South Asia. However, high affinities between CHG and South Asians probably reflect affinities to both CHG and Iranian Neolithic individuals.

Caucasus Hunter Gatherers had light and intermediate skin tones and brown eyes.

== Proto-Indo Europeans ==
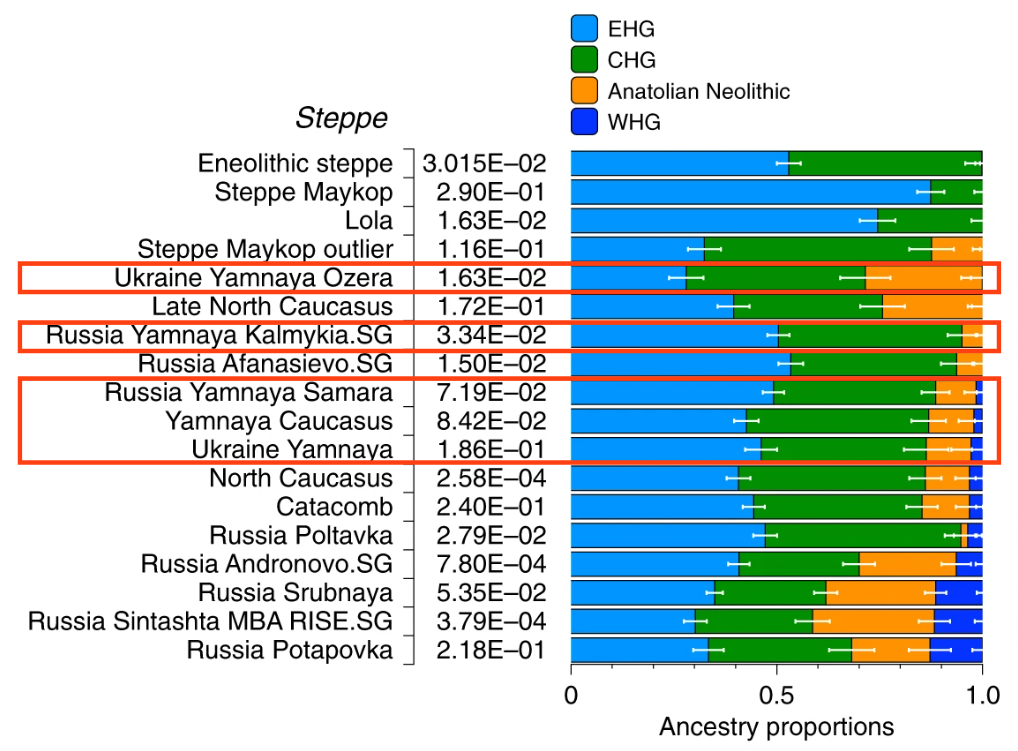
Admixture proportions of Yamnaya populations: they combined as Eastern Hunter Gatherer ( EHG) and Caucasian Hunter-Gatherer ( CHG), and the small proportions of Anatolian Farmer ( Anatolian Neolithic) and Western Hunter Gatherer ( WHG) ancestry.

During the Neolithic and early Eneolithic, likely during the 4th millennium BC, Caucasus hunter-gatherers (CHGs) mixed with Eastern Hunter-gatherers (EHGs) on the Pontic–Caspian steppe, with the resulting population, almost half-EHG and half-CHG, forming the genetic cluster known as Western Steppe Herder (WSH). According to David W. Anthony, Caucasus hunter-gatherer ancestry of Yamnaya is often with higher than 50%. As well as an overwhelming WSH ancestry, Yamnaya also have additional admixture from Anatolian and Levantine farmers, and the Western Hunter-gatherers (WHGs).

According to co-author Andrea Manica of the University of Cambridge:

The question of where the Yamnaya come from has been something of a mystery up to now [...] we can now answer that, as we've found that their genetic make-up is a mix of Eastern European hunter-gatherers and a population from this pocket of Caucasus hunter-gatherers who weathered much of the last Ice Age in apparent isolation.

Some scholars argue that the archaic PIE ('Indo-Anatolian') language may have originated among a CHG-rich population in Western Asia, based on the lack of EHG ancestry in the probable speakers of Anatolian languages. Others, such as Anthony, suggest that PIE was spoken by EHGs living in Eastern Europe.

According to Jones et al. (2015), Caucasus hunter-gatherer (CHG) "genomes significantly contributed to the Yamnaya steppe herders who migrated into Europe ~3,000 BCE, supporting a formative Caucasus influence on this important Early Bronze Age culture. CHG left their imprint on modern populations from the Caucasus and also Central and South Asia possibly correlating with the arrival of Indo-Aryan languages." For example, about 50–70% of Armenian ancestry is derived from CHG, persisting from Neolithic times to the present.

Wang et al. (2019) analysed genetic data of the North Caucasus of fossils dated between the 4th and 1st millennia BC and found correlation with modern groups of the South Caucasus, concluding that "unlike today – the Caucasus acted as a bridge rather than an insurmountable barrier to human movement".

According to Allentoft et al. (2024), The arrival and admixture of CHG with Caspian steppe cultures is dated to about 7,300-years-old, which is seen in two ancient samples from Golubaya Krinitsa with 18–24% admixture. suggestive of CHG-related ancestry extending past the middle Don to the Azov Sea coast and the Dnipro Valley during the second half of the 6th millennium BCE.

A 7000-year-old genome from the Caucasus (Nalchik) links the Volga's first herders to farmers of W. Asia and it seems that in the first half of the 5th millennium BCE cultural and mating networks helped agriculture and pastoralism spread from West Asia across the Caucasian, into the steppes between the Don and the Volga in Eastern Europe.

== Ancient Greece, Aegean and Italy ==
Beyond contributing to the population of mainland Europe through Bronze Age pastoralists of the Yamnaya, CHG also appears to have arrived on its own in the Aegean without Eastern European hunter–gatherer (EHG) ancestry and provided approximately 9–32% of ancestry to the Minoans. The origin of this CHG component might have been Central Anatolia.

Genetic analysis shows that Iranian-related ancestry, which was widespread in the Aegean by the Middle Bronze Age in association with the Minoan and Mycenaean cultures, had also spread as far west as Sicily in substantial proportion at least by the time of the Mycenaeans. One possibility is this ancestry spread west along with the Mycenaean cultural expansion. An arrival of the CHG-related component in Southern Italy from the Southern part of the Balkan Peninsula, including the Peloponnese, is compatible with the identification of genetic corridors linking the two regions and the presence of Southern European ancient signatures in Italy. Collected data from Iron Age individuals dating from 900 to 200 BCE (including the Republican period) group shows a clear ancestry shift from the Copper Age, interpreted by ADMIXTURE as the addition of a Steppe-related ancestry component, and an increase in the Neolithic-Iranian component.

Iran/Caucasus-related genetic influx was inferred in published individuals from the later Neolithic phases on the mainland (Peloponnese, around the fifth millennium BC) —but not earlier— as well as most of the EBA individuals from Euboea, Aegina and Koufonisia. comparison between ancient and modern samples, showing an overall similarity between Southern Italian and Iron Age Individuals, may suggest that the CHG/Iran_Neolithic signature reached the East side of the Adriatic Sea multiple times, or possibly as a continuous gene flow. Also in the Rocavecchia (1500–1365 BCE) In southern Italy.

In prehistoric Sardinia, the component associated with Iranian farmers, or Caucasus-related ancestry, present in Mainland Italy since the Neolithic (together with the EEF and WHG components), gradually increases from 0% in the Early Chalcolithic to about 5.8% in the Bronze Age. In Novilara, Iron age, PN43 is slightly shifted towards Near Eastern populations in the PCA and shows a high proportion of the CHG/Iran Neolithic component in Admixture analysis. they confirmed these results also with Admixture analysis, where a great genetic influence from the CHG/Iran Neolithic component is observed in all Late Antiquity Pesaro individuals.

Although largely absent in the preceding Iron Age, Iran N-like admixture entered Balkan populations in a multiphased manner, with some Roman-era-Early Medieval populations being modelled as deriving 0-15% of their ancestry from this source (Croatia Roman Beli Manastir and Šćitarjevo, Montenegro Doclea Roman), which in adjacent regions can be as high as 20-30% (Croatia Novo Selo Bunje, Zadar, and Trogir Dragulin). Iranian Neolithic Ancestry (~14%) is observed also in “ancient profile” on the French island of Corsica.

== Central Asia, West Asia and South Asia ==
CHG/Iranian Plateau Neolithic-like ancestry is prominent in pre-steppe admixture Chalcolithic and Bronze Age (4500–2000 BCE) populations in Central Asia, like the Bactria–Margiana Archaeological Complex (which also had Anatolian Neolithic Farmer-related ancestry) as well as in the northwestern Indian subcontinent such as in sites in or adjacent to the Indus Valley Civilisation (who have mixed CHG-related and Ancient Ancestral South Indian ancestry).

It is unclear as to whether the dispersal of CHG/Iranian Plateau-related ancestry eastwards to the Indian subcontinent was the result of the migration of farmers or an earlier dispersal of hunter-gatherers who later adopted farming, but this dispersal likely occurred sometime before 6000 BCE due to the lack of Anatolian Farmer-related ancestry in ancient South Asians, but which is present in the Iranian Plateau after this time. This pre-steppe CHG-related ancestry makes up a significant proportion of the ancestry of modern South Asians. WSHs, who were of significant CHG ancestry, also later migrated into Central Asia and South Asia.

Maier et al. (2023), show four graphs with four admixture events that model the Indus Periphery group as a mixture of three or four sources, with a significant fraction of its ancestry derived from the Hajji Firuz Neolithic or Tepe Hissar Chalcolithic lineages including both Iranian and Anatolian ancestries.

According to Kerdoncuff et al. (2024) in all 22 ASI individuals, the Iranian-related ancestry appears to derive from early Neolithic and Copper Age individuals from Central Asian cultures – either Sarazm_EN or Namazga_CA or a group containing Sarazm_EN and Parkhai_Anau_EN, which was previously suggested as the source for Indus Periphery Cline. The latter two models also provide good fits for Indus Periphery West, though using Sarazm_EN alone as the source does not yield a good fit. The data are consistent with a common source for the ancient Iranian-related ancestry in ANI, ASI, Austroasiatic-related and East Asian-related individuals in India, suggesting that the Iranian-related gene flow occurred well before the arrival of Steppe pastoralist-related ancestry in the Bronze Age (~1900–1500 BCE).

== See also ==
- Prehistoric Caucasus

== Sources ==
- Anthony, David (2009b), "Ancient DNA, Mating Networks, and the Anatolian Split", in Serangeli, Matilde; Olander, Thomas (eds.), Dispersals and Diversification: Linguistic and Archaeological Perspectives on the Early Stages of Indo-European, BRILL
- Fu, Q.; Posth, C.; Hajdinjak, M.; Petr, Martin; et al. (2016). "The genetic history of Ice Age Europe". Nature. 534 (7606): 200–205. Bibcode:2016Natur.534..200F. doi:10.1038/nature17993. hdl:10211.3/198594. PMC 4943878. PMID 27135931.
- Haak, Wolfgang (2015), "Massive migration from the steppe was a source for Indo-European languages in Europe", Nature, 522 (7555): 207–211, arXiv:1502.02783, Bibcode:2015Natur.522..207H, doi:10.1038/nature14317, PMC 5048219, PMID 25731166
- Jeong, Choongwon; Balanovsky, Oleg; Lukianova, Elena; Kahbatkyzy, Nurzhibek; Flegontov, Pavel; Zaporozhchenko, Valery; Immel, Alexander; Wang, Chuan-Chao; Ixan, Olzhas; Khussainova, Elmira; Bekmanov, Bakhytzhan; Zaibert, Victor; Lavryashina, Maria; Pocheshkhova, Elvira; Yusupov, Yuldash; Agdzhoyan, Anastasiya; Koshel, Sergey; Bukin, Andrei; Nymadawa, Pagbajabyn; Turdikulova, Shahlo; Dalimova, Dilbar; Churnosov, Mikhail; Skhalyakho, Roza; Daragan, Denis; Bogunov, Yuri; Bogunova, Anna; Shtrunov, Alexandr; Dubova, Nadezhda; Zhabagin, Maxat; Yepiskoposyan, Levon; Churakov, Vladimir; Pislegin, Nikolay; Damba, Larissa; Saroyants, Ludmila; Dibirova, Khadizhat; Atramentova, Lubov; Utevska, Olga; Idrisov, Eldar; Kamenshchikova, Evgeniya; Evseeva, Irina; Metspalu, Mait; Outram, Alan K.; Robbeets, Martine; Djansugurova, Leyla; Balanovska, Elena; Schiffels, Stephan; Haak, Wolfgang; Reich, David; Krause, Johannes (29 April 2019). "The genetic history of admixture across inner Eurasia". Nature Ecology & Evolution. 3 (6): 966–976. Bibcode:2019NatEE...3..966J. doi:10.1038/s41559-019-0878-2. PMC 6542712. PMID 31036896.
- Jones, E.; Gonzalez-Fortes, G.; Connell, S.; Siska, V.; et al. (2015). "Upper Palaeolithic genomes reveal deep roots of modern Eurasians". Nature Communications. 6 (8912): 8912. Bibcode:2015NatCo...6.8912J. doi:10.1038/ncomms9912. PMC 4660371. PMID 26567969.
- Lazaridis, I.; Nadel, D.; Rollefson, G.; Merrett, D.; et al. (2016). "Genomic insights into the origin of farming in the ancient Near East". Nature. 536 (7617): 419–424. Bibcode:2016Natur.536..419L. doi:10.1038/nature19310. PMC 5003663. PMID 27459054.
- Mathieson, Iain (23 November 2015). "Genome-wide patterns of selection in 230 ancient Eurasians". Nature. 528 (7583). Nature Research: 499–503. Bibcode:2015Natur.528..499M. doi:10.1038/nature16152. PMC 4918750. PMID 26595274.
- Narasimhan, Vagheesh M.; Patterson, N.J.; Moorjani, Priya; Rohland, Nadin; et al. (2019), "The Formation of Human Populations in South and Central Asia", Science, 365 (6457) eaat7487, Bibcode:2019Sci...365t7487N, doi:10.1126/science.aat7487, hdl:10278/3722735, PMC 6822619, PMID 31488661, archived from the original on 29 December 2020
