= Sakazhia Cave Natural Monument =

Paleolithic cave and natural monument in Georgia

Sakajia Cave
- საკაჟიას მღვიმე (Georgian)
- Sakazhia Cave; Virchow Cave
- Location in Georgia
- 42°16′46.23″N 42°45′28.34″E
- Type: Karst cave; archaeological site; natural monument
- Periods: Late Middle Paleolithic; Upper Paleolithic
- Cultures: Mousterian
- Location: Godogani, Terjola Municipality, Imereti, Georgia
- Region: Tskaltsitela Gorge
- Nearest city: Kutaisi

Site notes
- Material: Limestone
- Elevation: 235 metres (771 ft)
- Excavation dates: 1914; 1936–1937; 1971; 1974–1980; 2019–2020
- Archaeologists: Rudolf Schmidt; Leon Kozłowski; Giorgi Nioradze; Medea Nioradze
- Discovered: 1914
- Public access: Permit required

Sakajia Cave (Georgian: საკაჟიას მღვიმე), also known as Sakazhia Cave and formerly as Virchow Cave, is a karst cave, protected natural monument, and multi-period archaeological site near Godogani in Terjola Municipality, Imereti, western Georgia.

Its deposits contain late Middle Paleolithic Mousterian occupations, an Upper Paleolithic horizon, and later prehistoric material. The site is especially important for its fragmentary Neanderthal remains and for evidence that Middle Paleolithic occupation continued in western Georgia until approximately 40,000–37,000 years ago.

== Location and cave ==
The cave lies on the left side of the Tskaltsitela gorge, about 10 kilometres (6.2 mi) northeast of Kutaisi, within the Okriba karst massif.

It stands approximately 80 metres (260 ft) above the river. Its oval entrance is about 5 to 6 metres (16 to 20 ft) wide and 7 metres (23 ft) high. Around 10 metres (33 ft) beyond the entrance, the cave divides into galleries approximately 20 and 70 metres (66 and 230 ft) long. The archaeological directory of the Georgian National Museum records an elevation of 235 metres (771 ft).

Sakajia was designated a natural monument in 2007. The cave is not developed for tourism, and entry requires permission from the administration of the Imereti protected areas.

== Research history ==
Rudolf Schmidt and Leon Kozłowski identified and investigated the cave in 1914; it was also recorded as Virchow Cave. Giorgi Nioradze conducted excavations in 1936–1937, establishing the presence of Upper Paleolithic material, but the work was interrupted during the Second World War. Medea Nioradze resumed research in 1971 and directed excavations from 1974 to 1980, when Middle Paleolithic deposits were identified beneath the Upper Paleolithic horizon.

In 2009, the surviving sections were documented and sampled as part of a program to revise the chronology of Sakajia, nearby Ortvala Cave, and Bronze Cave. New systematic excavations at Sakajia began in 2019–2020. They produced additional Middle Paleolithic artifacts, fauna, and radiocarbon samples, while also revealing disturbance and mixing in parts of the upper sequence. Finds from the site are held by the Georgian National Museum and the Peter the Great Museum of Anthropology and Ethnography in Saint Petersburg.

== Stratigraphy and chronology ==
The excavated sequence contains approximately 4.5 metres (15 ft) of sandy sediment. In the earlier stratigraphic scheme, the uppermost layer contained Chalcolithic and Bronze Age artifacts, Layer 2 contained Upper Paleolithic material, and Layers 3a–3f formed a six-part Mousterian sequence. Most Middle Paleolithic artifacts came from Layers 3a and 3b, whereas the lowest layers contained only isolated finds.

An older conventional radiocarbon determination of 27,100 ± 800 years BP from a Middle Paleolithic layer was subsequently judged too young and of questionable reliability. Accelerator mass spectrometry dating and Bayesian modeling later placed the end of the latest Middle Paleolithic layer between approximately 40,200 and 37,140 calibrated years BP. The same model placed the beginning of the Upper Paleolithic layer between approximately 39,300 and 34,700 calibrated years BP, but that estimate rested on a single radiocarbon determination.

The 2019–2020 excavations found that parts of the upper deposits had been mixed by later human activity. The resulting reassessment cautioned that the earlier date from Upper Paleolithic Layer IIb should not be used as a precise chronological marker. A newly dated bone from Middle Paleolithic Layer IIIb produced a calibrated range of 39,236–37,691 years BP, independently confirming a very late Middle Paleolithic occupation at the site. A separate determination of 11,700 ± 80 radiocarbon years BP has also been reported from the upper sequence, although its cultural assignment was left uncertain in the later dating study.

== Archaeological evidence ==
The Middle Paleolithic sequence yielded approximately 1,500 stone artifacts, mainly made from locally available flint or chert; the name Sakajia has accordingly been translated as “flint place”. The assemblages contain preferential and recurrent Levallois reduction alongside laminar production. Elongated flakes and blades were frequently selected for retouch, and the toolkits include points, side-scrapers, denticulates, and notched tools.

The older Upper Paleolithic collection includes prismatic and pyramidal cores, burins, scrapers, backed bladelets, and smaller numbers of shouldered points and microgravettes. The original excavators distinguished several Upper Paleolithic occurrences, whereas later excavators treated the material as a single unit. A regional synthesis consequently suggested that the 11,700 BP determination may date only a late phase of the sequence, rather than the collection as a whole.

Late Pleistocene fauna from the cave include steppe bison, Caucasian tur, red and roe deer, wild boar, horse, rhinoceros, cave and brown bears, and cave lion. In the small faunal sample recovered during the recent excavations, bear remains were the most numerous identified group. Cut marks and deliberate fractures occurred on more than one-quarter of the non-dental specimens, indicating that humans modified part of the assemblage.

== Human remains ==
Human remains attributed to Neanderthals were recovered from several Middle Paleolithic layers. They include a partial left maxilla retaining four teeth from Layer 3d, an isolated lower first molar from Layer 3b, and more fragmentary cranial remains reported from Layer 3a. The maxilla has been attributed to an adult, while the isolated molar belonged to a young adult or subadult. Attempts to date the maxilla directly were unsuccessful because it retained too little collagen; its age therefore depends on its stratigraphic association.

The 2012 chronology made Sakajia important to discussions of the end of Neanderthal occupation in the southern Caucasus. That study interpreted the available sequences as supporting Neanderthal disappearance before the establishment of Upper Paleolithic populations, while emphasizing that the conclusion rested on only a few dated sites. The 2025 reassessment retained Sakajia as evidence for a late Middle Paleolithic occupation but cautioned that its disturbed upper deposits do not provide a robust and precise chronological marker for the Georgian Upper Paleolithic.

== See also ==
- Middle Paleolithic in Georgia (country)
- Tskaltsitela Gorge Natural Monument
