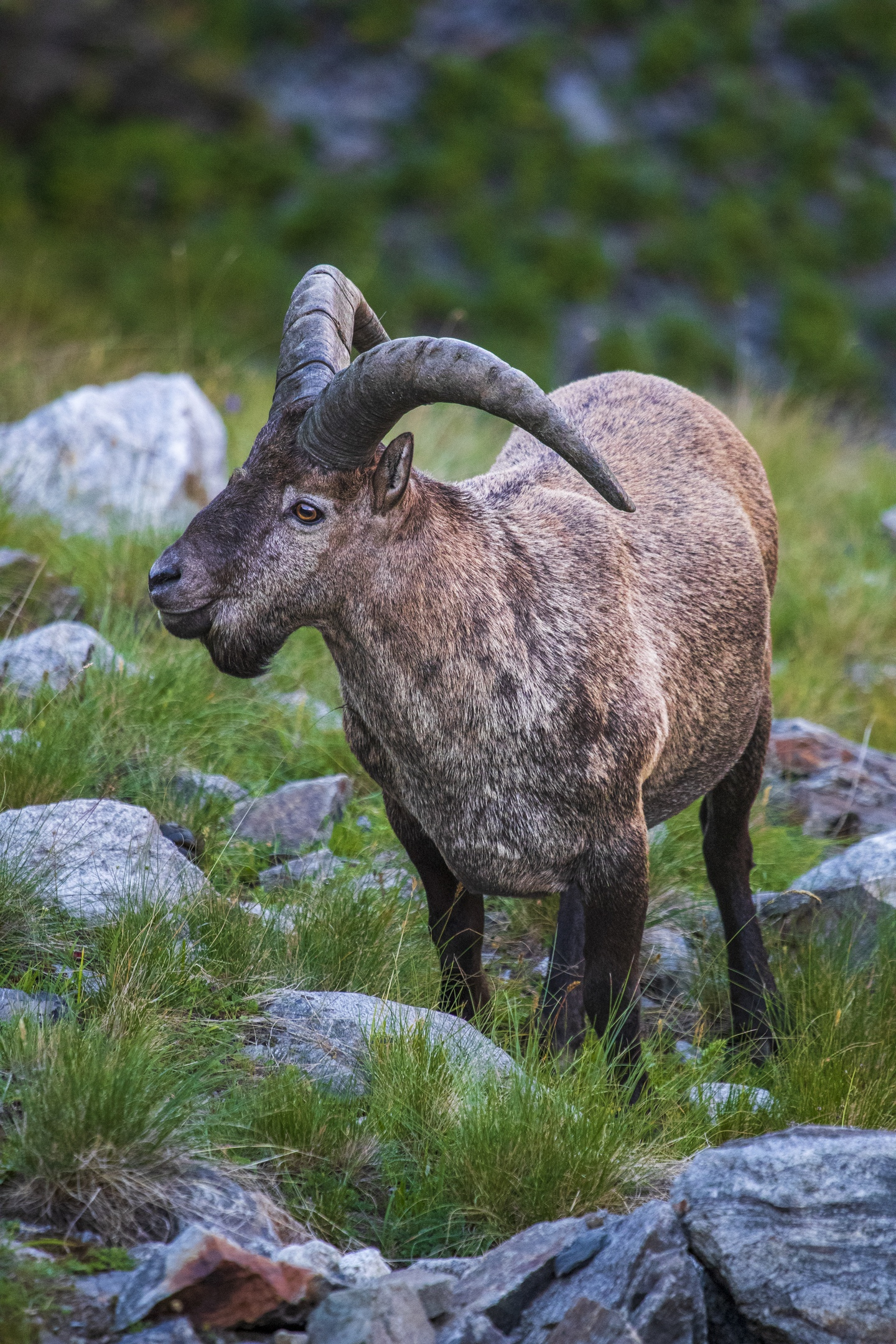

Conservation status
- Endangered (IUCN 3.1)
- CITES Appendix II

Scientific classification
- Kingdom: Animalia
- Phylum: Chordata
- Class: Mammalia
- Order: Artiodactyla
- Family: Bovidae
- Subfamily: Caprinae
- Genus: Capra
- Species: C. caucasica

Binomial name
- Capra caucasica Güldenstädt and Pallas, 1783

= West Caucasian tur =

Species of mammal

The West Caucasian tur (Capra caucasica) is a mountain-dwelling goat-antelope native to the western half of the Caucasus Mountains range, in Georgia and European Russia.

== Names and taxonomy ==
It is also known by the names "zebuder," "zac" and "Caucasian ibex." The East Caucasian tur is sometimes considered a subspecies of this species, though some separate the two out as different species. There is a third intermediate form that lives between the two called the Mid-Caucasian tur.

== Description ==
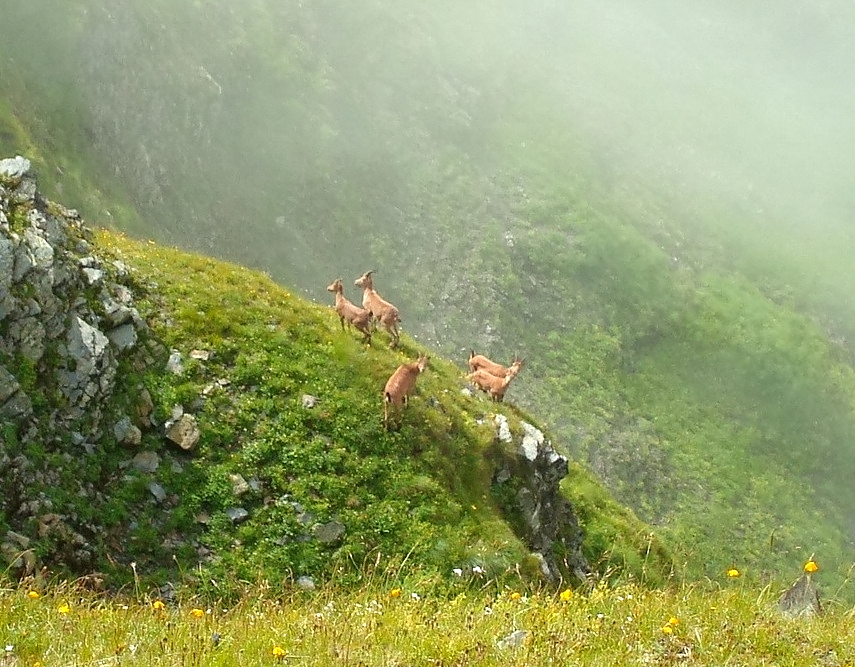
West Caucasian turs in Caucasus Biosphere Reserve

West Caucasian turs stand up to 1 m (3.3 ft) tall at the shoulder and weigh around 65 kg (143 lb). They have large but narrow bodies and short legs. West Caucasian turs have a chestnut coat with a yellow underbelly and darker legs. Their horns are scimitar-shaped and heavily ridged. In males, these horns are around 70 cm (28 in), while in females they are much smaller.

They are sexually dimorphic, with the males larger than the females.

== Habitat ==
West Caucasian turs live in rough mountainous terrain between 800 and 4,000 m (2,600 and 13,100 ft) above sea level, where they eat mainly grasses and leaves. They used to be found in much lower altitudes, have been forced upwards by humans and climate change. Their range is about 4,500 square kilometres (1,700 mi^{2}), and likewise used to be much larger before the 20th century. In the Pleistocene, it was found as far from the Caucasus as southern France.

== Behaviour, ecology, and conservation status ==
The West Caucasian tur is nocturnal, eating in the open at night, and sheltering during the day. They live in herds of around ten individuals in the summer, and herd sizes increase during the winter to about 20. The mating season is November to January, and the kids are born in May through July.

They are preyed upon by steppe wolves and lynxes; Persian leopards and Syrian brown bears may also be possible predators. Humans are also a risk due to hunting expeditions; it is legal to hunt them from August to November in Russia, though they are fully protected in Georgia. They are sometimes poached, for meat, skin, or horns, which are used to make drinking horns called Kantsi. Many also die of avalanches.

It is listed as Endangered on the IUCN Red List, as the wild population is estimated to be between 3,000 and 4,000 individuals. This population has been declining due to livestock grazing in their habitat and poaching, as well as harsh winters.

== See also ==
- Caucasus mixed forests
- East Caucasian tur
- Capra dalii
