= Early European Farmers =

Archaeogenetic name for an ancestral genetic component

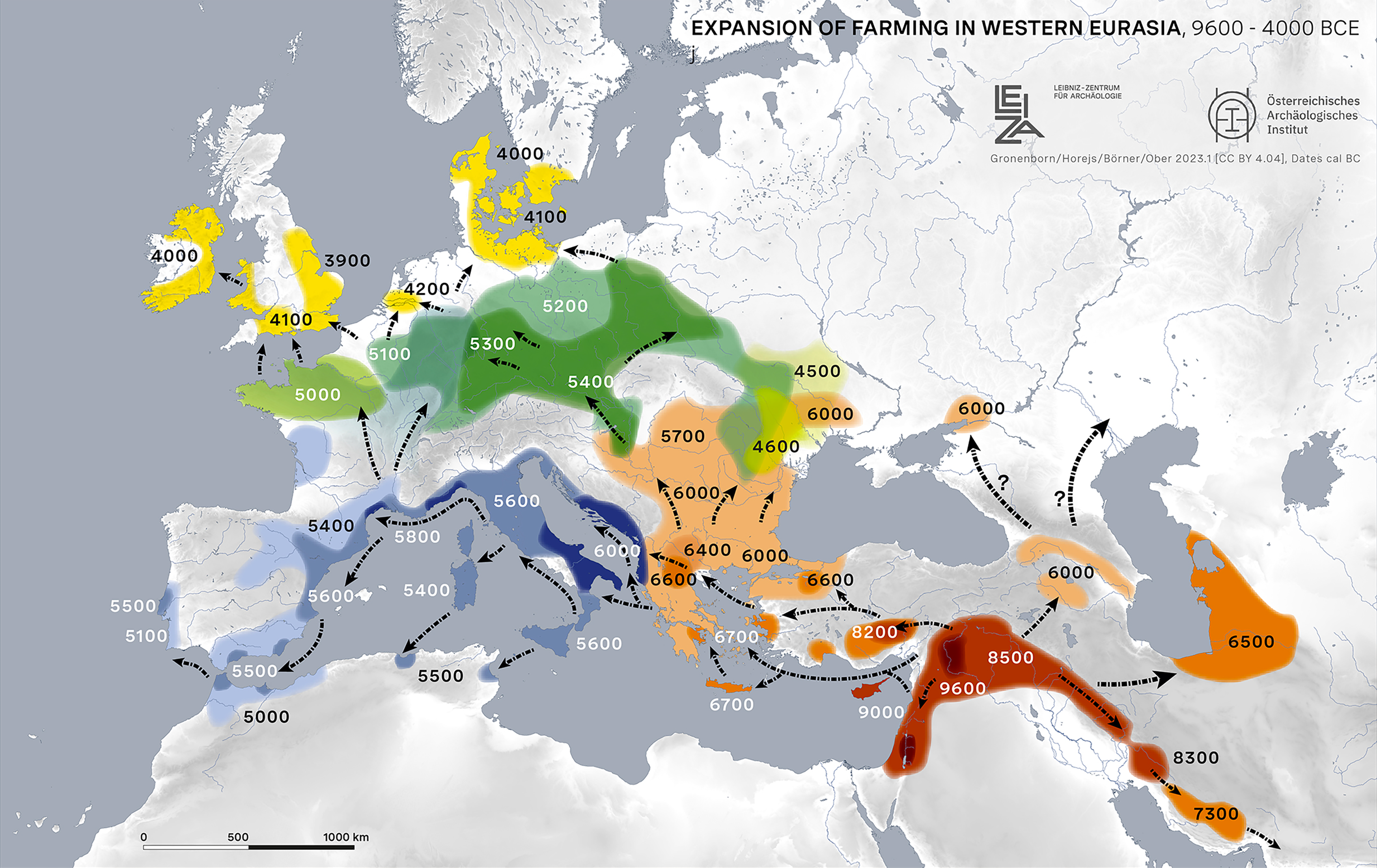
A map of the spread of farming from Southwest Asia to Europe and Northwest Africa, between 9600 and 3900 BC

Early European Farmers (EEF) (Note: Sometimes called as First European Farmers, Neolithic European Farmers or Ancient Aegean Farmers) were a group of the Anatolian Neolithic Farmers (ANF) who brought agriculture to Europe and Northwest Africa. The Anatolian Neolithic Farmers were an ancestral component, first identified in farmers from Anatolia (also known as Asia Minor) in the Neolithic, and outside of Europe and Northwest Africa. Although the spread of agriculture from the Middle East to Europe has long been recognized through archaeology, because of lack of ancient human DNA from pre-Neolithic times, it was unknown how this happened until recently. However, ancient DNA has now shown that agriculture was largely spread via migration.

The earliest farmers in Anatolia derived most (80–90%) of their ancestry from the region's local hunter-gatherers, with minor Levantine and Caucasus-related ancestry. The Early European Farmers moved into Europe from Anatolia through Southeast Europe from around 7,000 BC, gradually spread via demic diffusion north and westwards, and reached Northwest Africa via the Iberian Peninsula. Genetic studies have confirmed that the later Farmers of Europe generally have also a minor contribution from Western Hunter-Gatherers (WHGs), with significant regional variation.

European farmer and hunter-gatherer populations coexisted and traded in some locales, although evidence suggests that the relationship was not always peaceful. Over the next 4,000 years or so, Europe was transformed into agricultural communities, with WHGs being effectively replaced across Europe. During the Chalcolithic and early Bronze Age, people who had Western Steppe Herder (WSH) ancestry moved into Europe and mingled with the EEF population; these WSH, originating from the Yamnaya culture of the Pontic steppe of Eastern Europe, probably spoke Indo-European languages. EEF ancestry is common in modern European and Northwest African populations. It is highest in Southern Europeans, with Sardinians carrying the highest EEF ancestry of any present-day population.

A distinct group of the Anatolian Neolithic Farmers spread into the east of Anatolia, and left a considerable genetic legacy in Iranian Plateau, South Caucasus, Levant (during the Pre-Pottery Neolithic B) and Mesopotamia. They also have a minor role in the ethnogenesis of WSHs of Yamnaya culture.

The ANF ancestry is found in substantial levels in contemporary European, West Asian and North African populations, and is also found in Central, and South Asian populations at lower levels.

== Overview ==
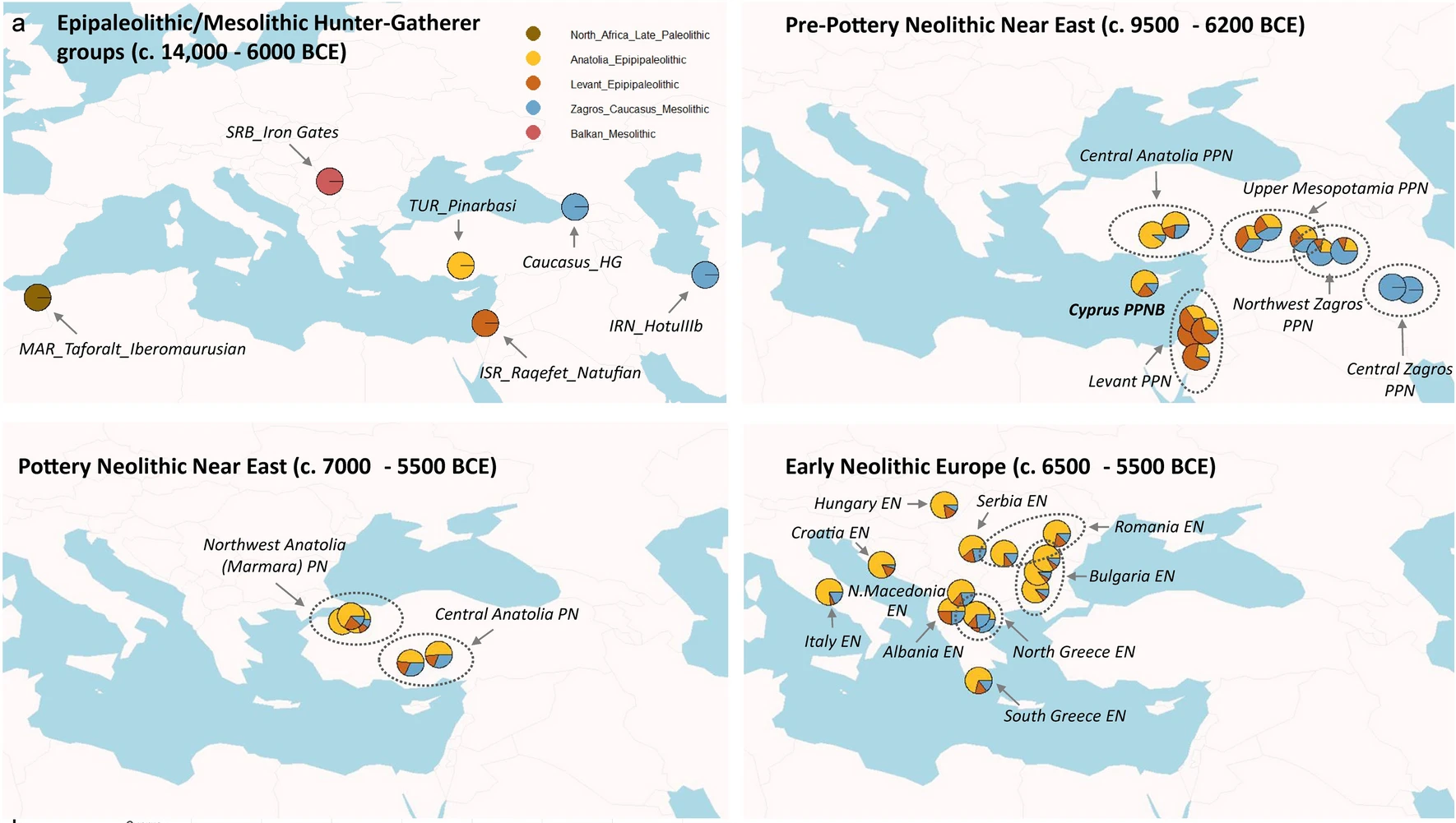
Admixture model of Neolithic West Eurasian populations based on ancestral Epipaleolithic/Mesolithic populations: Mesolithic Zagros/Caucasus hunter-gatherers Epipalaeolithic Central Anatolian hunter-gatherers Epipaleolithic Levantine Natufian hunter-gatherers Mesolithic Balkan hunter-gatherers Epipalaeolithic North African Iberomaurusian hunter-gatherers

Populations of the Anatolian Neolithic derived most of their ancestry from the Anatolian hunter-gatherers (AHG), with a minor geneflow from Iranian/Caucasus and Levantine related sources, suggesting that agriculture was adopted in situ by these hunter-gatherers and not spread by demic diffusion into the region. Ancestors of AHGs and EEFs are believed to have split off from Western Hunter-Gatherers (WHGs) between 45kya to 26kya during the Last Glacial Maximum, and to have split from Caucasus Hunter-Gatherers (CHGs) between 25kya to 14kya.

A 2025 study found that the spread of Neolithic cultures in Western Anatolia and the Aegean was a complex phenomenon involving admixture between Central Anatolian farmers as well as Western Anatolian hunter-gatherers who adopted farming, leading to the formation of the classic "Anatolian Farmer" genetic profile sometime after 7000 BC, and that in Western Anatolia the adoption of agriculture was not necessarily a purely migratory phenomenon, but involved cultural exchange.

Genetic studies demonstrate that the introduction of farming to Europe in the 7th millennium BC was associated with a mass migration of people from Northwest Anatolia to Southeast Europe, which resulted in the replacement of almost all (c. 98%) of the local Balkan hunter-gatherer gene pool with ancestry from Anatolian farmers. In the Balkans, the EEFs appear to have divided into two wings, who expanded further west into Europe along the Danube (Linear Pottery culture) or the western Mediterranean (Cardial Ware). Large parts of Northern Europe and Eastern Europe nevertheless remained unsettled by EEFs. During the Middle Neolithic there was a largely male-driven resurgence of WHG ancestry among many EEF-derived communities, leading to increasing frequencies of the hunter-gatherer paternal haplogroups among them.

Around 7,500 years ago, EEFs originating from the Iberian Peninsula migrated into Northwest Africa, bringing farming to the region. They were a key component in the neolithization process of the Maghreb, and intermixed with the local forager communities.

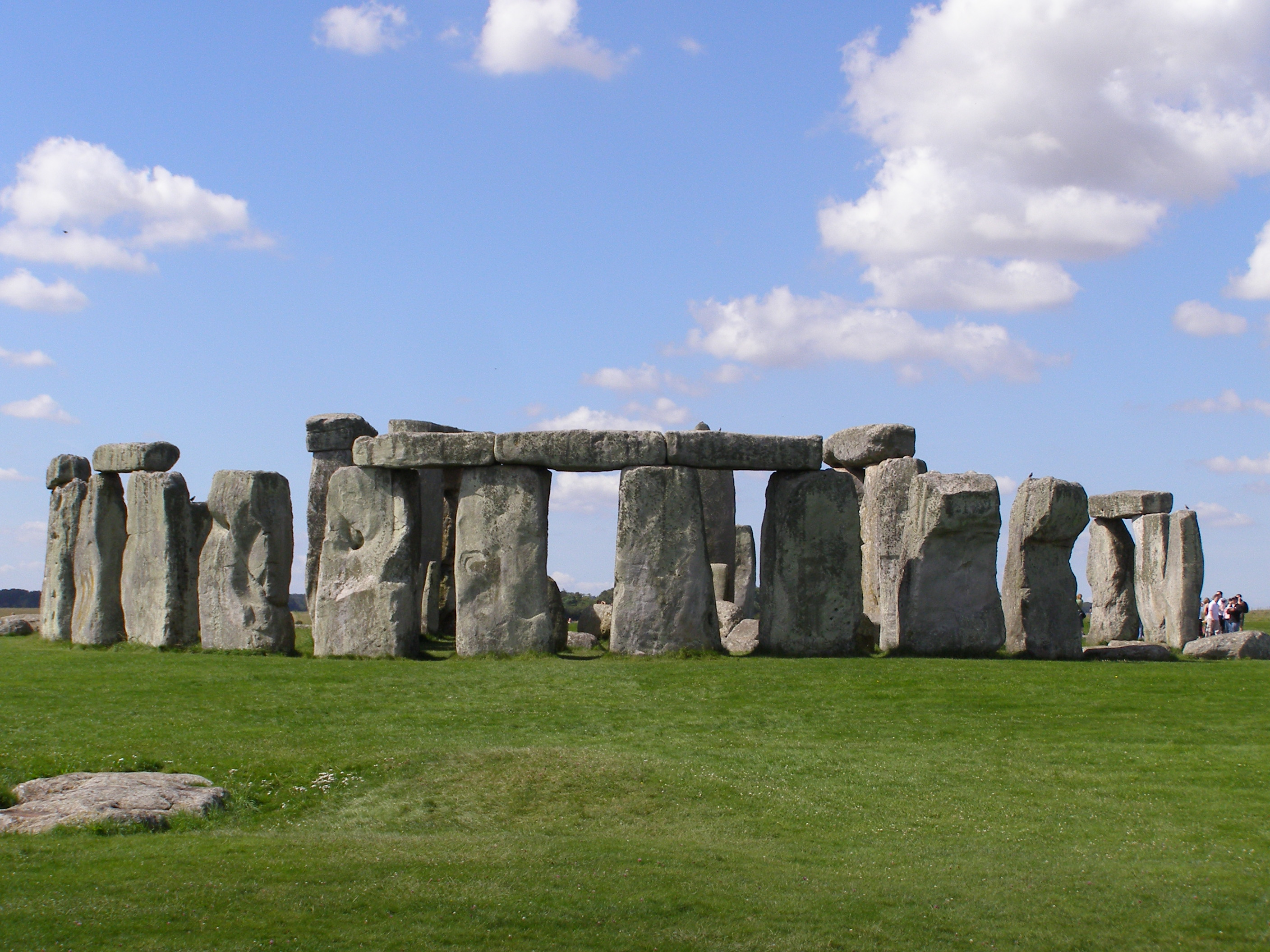
The builders of Stonehenge were descendants of Neolithic farmers who migrated to the area about 6,000 years ago

The farmers of the Neolithic British Isles had entered the region through a mass migration c. 4,000 BC. They carried about 80% EEF and 20% WHG ancestry and were found to be closely related to Neolithic peoples of Iberia, which implies that they were descended from agriculturalists who had moved westwards from the Balkans along the Mediterranean coast. The arrival of farming populations led to the almost complete replacement of the native WHGs of the British Isles, who did not experience a genetic resurgence in the succeeding centuries. More than 90% of Britain's Neolithic gene pool was replaced with the arrival of the Bell Beaker people around 2,500 BC, who had approximately 50% WSH ancestry.

The individuals buried in Neolithic Ireland were found to be largely of EEF ancestry (with WHG admixture), and were closely related to peoples of Neolithic Britain and Iberia. It was found that the Neolithic peoples of Ireland had almost entirely replaced the native Irish Hunter-Gatherers through a rapid maritime colonization.

The people of the Funnelbeaker culture of southern Scandinavia were largely of EEF descent, with slight hunter-gatherer admixture, suggesting that the emergence of the Neolithic in Scandinavia was a result of human migration from the south. The Funnelbeakers were found to be genetically highly different from people of the neighboring hunter-gatherer Pitted Ware culture. The Pitted Ware culture carried no EEF admixture and were instead genetically similar to other European hunter-gatherers.

The most common paternal haplogroup among EEFs was haplogroup G2a. Haplogroups E1b1, and R1b have also been found. Their maternal haplogroups consisted mainly of West Eurasian lineages including haplogroups H2, I, and T2. Significant numbers of central European farmers belonged to East Asian maternal lineage N9a, which is almost non-existent in modern Europeans, but common in East Asia. The high frequency of the East Asian mitochondrial haplogroup N9a in Neolithic cultures of the Carpathian Basin was disputed by another study.

Neolithic cultures in Europe in c. 4500–4000 BC

During the Chalcolithic and early Bronze Age, the EEF-derived cultures of Europe were overwhelmed by successive migrations of Western Steppe Herders (WSHs) from the Pontic–Caspian steppe, who carried roughly equal amounts of Eastern Hunter-Gatherer (EHG) and Caucasus Hunter-Gatherer (CHG) ancestries. These migrations led to EEF paternal DNA lineages in Europe being almost entirely replaced with WSH-derived paternal DNA (mainly subclades of EHG-derived R1b and R1a). EEF maternal DNA (mainly haplogroup N) was also substantially replaced, being supplanted by steppe lineages, suggesting the migrations involved both males and females from the steppe.

A 2017 study found that Bronze Age European with steppe ancestry had elevated EEF ancestry on the X chromosome, suggesting a sex bias, in which Steppe ancestry was inherited by more male than female ancestors. This study's results could not be replicated in a follow-up study by Iosif Lazaridis and David Reich, suggesting that the authors had mis-measured the admixture proportions of their sample.

EEF ancestry remains widespread throughout Europe, ranging from about 60% near the Mediterranean Sea, with a peak of 65% in the island of Sardinia, and diminishing northwards to about 10% in northern Scandinavia. According to early 2020s studies, the highest EEF ancestry found in modern Europeans ranges from 67% to over 80% in modern Sardinians, Italians, and Iberians, with the lowest EEF ancestry found in modern Europeans ranging around 35-40% in modern Finns, Lithuanians and Latvians. EEF ancestry is also prominent in living Northwest Africans like Moroccans and Algerians.

== Physical appearance and allele frequency ==
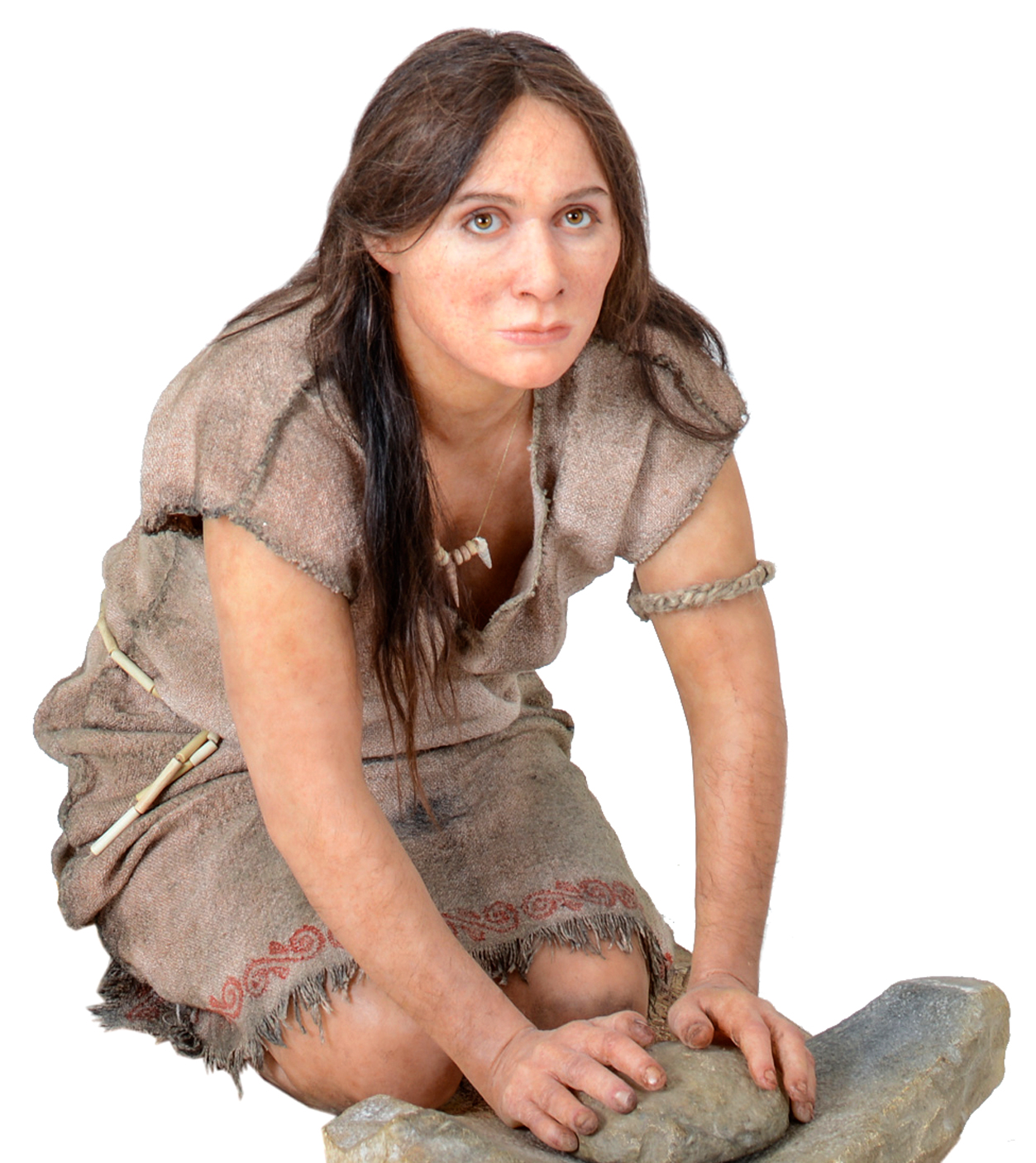
A reconstruction of a Neolithic farmer from Europe, Science Museum in Trento

European hunter-gatherers were much taller than EEFs, and the replacement of European hunter-gatherers by EEFs resulted in a dramatic decrease in genetic height throughout Europe. During the later phases of the Neolithic, height increased among European farmers, probably due to increasing admixture with hunter-gatherers. During the Late Neolithic and Bronze Age, further reductions of EEF ancestry in Europe due to migrations of peoples with steppe-related ancestry is associated with further increases in height. High frequencies of EEF ancestry in Southern Europe might partly explain the gradient in height going from shorter Southern Europe to taller Northern Europe, whose inhabitants carry increased levels of steppe-related ancestry.

The Early European Farmers are believed to have been mostly dark haired and dark eyed, and light skinned, with the derived SLC24A5 being fixed in the Anatolia Neolithic, although a genetic study of Ötzi the Iceman, a Chalcolithic mummy of EEF ancestry, found that he had a darker skin tone than contemporary southern Europeans. A study on different EEF remains throughout Europe concluded that they most likely had an "intermediate to light skin complexion". A 2024 paper found that risk alleles for mood-related phenotypes are enriched in the ancestry of Neolithic farmers.

== Subsistence ==
EEFs and their Anatolian forebears kept taurine cattle, pigs, sheep, and goats as livestock, and planted cereal crops like wheat.

== Social organisation ==
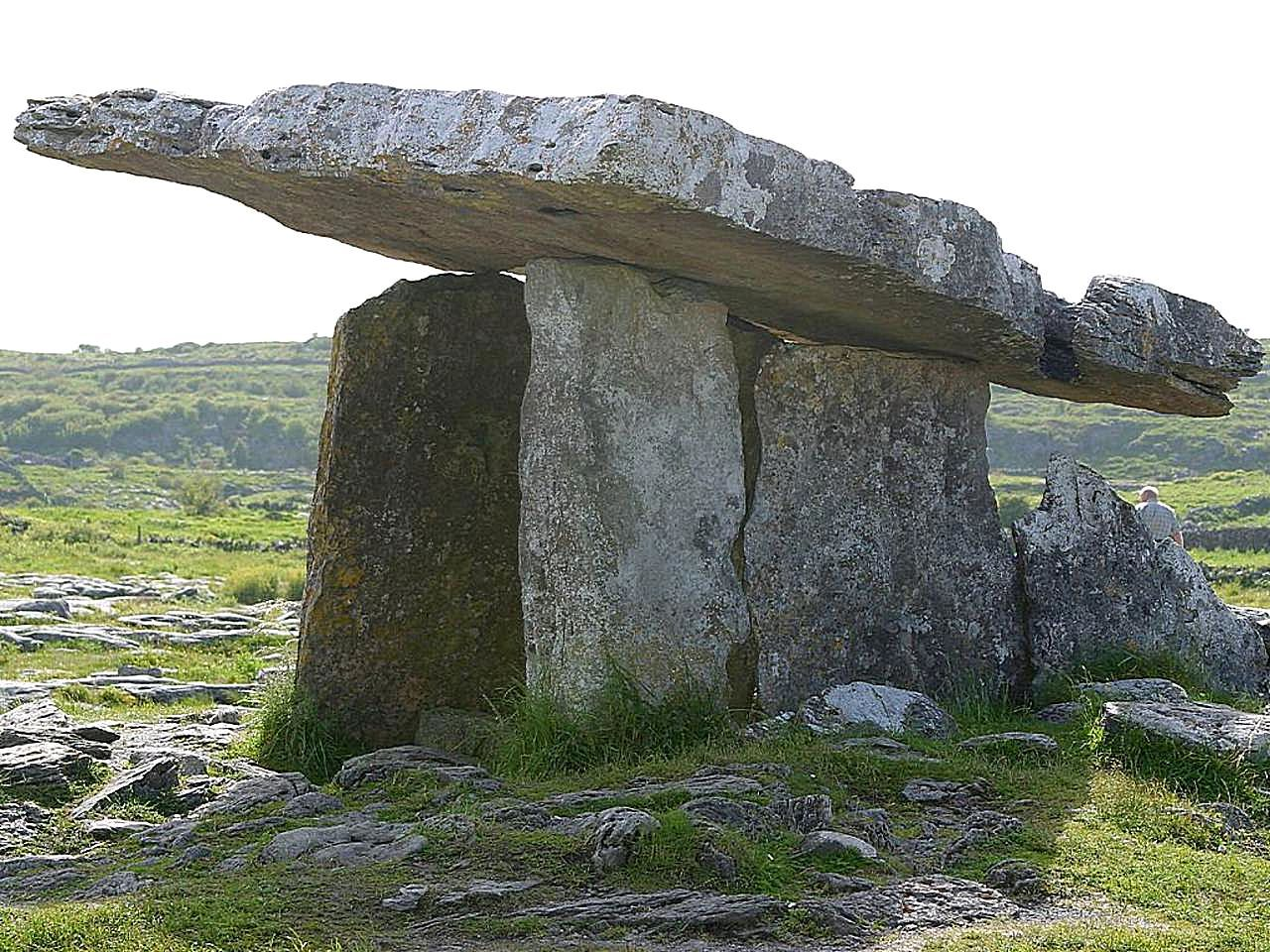
Poulnabrone dolmen, the Burren, County Clare, Ireland

The settlements of the Cucuteni–Trypillia culture, such as Talianki in western Ukraine, were the largest settlements in Eurasia, and possibly the world, dating to the 5th millennium BC. Research indicates that the settlements had a three-level settlement hierarchy, with the possibility of state-level societies. An excavated mega-structures suggests the presence of public buildings for meetings or ceremonies.

Genetic analysis of individuals found in Neolithic tombs suggests that at least some EEF peoples were patrilineal (tracing descent through the male line), with the tombs' occupants mostly consisting of the male descendants of a single male common ancestor and their children, as well as their wives, who were genetically unrelated to their husbands, suggesting female exogamy.

A Neolithic royal buried at Newgrange was found to be highly inbred and possibly the product of an incestual relationship, suggesting that this community was highly socially stratified and dominated by a line of powerful "god-kings".

== See also ==
- Neolithic Europe
- Neolithic decline
- Neolithic architecture

== Bibliography ==
- Alt, Kurt W.; Rodríguez, Cristina Tejedor (7 February 2020). "A massacre of early Neolithic farmers in the high Pyrenees at Els Trocs, Spain". Scientific Reports. 10 (2131). Nature Research: 2131. Bibcode:2020NatSR..10.2131A. doi:10.1038/s41598-020-58483-9. PMC 7005801. PMID 32034181.
- Brace, Selina; Diekmann, Yoan (15 April 2019). "Ancient genomes indicate population replacement in Early Neolithic Britain". Nature Ecology and Evolution. 3 (5). Nature Research: 765–771. Bibcode:2019NatEE...3..765B. doi:10.1038/s41559-019-0871-9. PMC 6520225. PMID 30988490.
- Brunel, Samantha; Bennett, E. Andrew (9 June 2020). "Ancient genomes from present-day France unveil 7,000 years of its demographic history". Proceedings of the National Academy of Sciences of the United States of America. 117 (23). National Academy of Sciences: 12791–12798. Bibcode:2020PNAS..11712791B. doi:10.1073/pnas.1918034117. PMC 7293694. PMID 32457149.
- Cassidy, Lara M.; Maoldúin, Ros Ó. (17 June 2020). "A dynastic elite in monumental Neolithic society". Nature. 582 (7812). Nature Research: 384–388. Bibcode:2020Natur.582..384C. doi:10.1038/s41586-020-2378-6. PMC 7116870. PMID 32555485. S2CID 219729757.
- Fregel, Rosa; Méndez, Fernando L. (26 June 2018). "Ancient genomes from North Africa evidence prehistoric migrations to the Maghreb from both the Levant and Europe". Proceedings of the National Academy of Sciences of the United States of America. 115 (26). National Academy of Sciences: 6774–6779. Bibcode:2018PNAS..115.6774F. doi:10.1073/pnas.1800851115. PMC 6042094. PMID 29895688.
- Simões, Luciana G; Günther, Torsten (7 June 2023). "Northwest African Neolithic initiated by migrants from Iberia and Levant". Nature. 618 (7965). Nature Research: 550–556. Bibcode:2023Natur.618..550S. doi:10.1038/s41586-023-06166-6. PMC 10266975. PMID 37286608.
- Goldberg, Amy; Günther, Torsten (7 March 2017). "Ancient X chromosomes reveal contrasting sex bias in Neolithic and Bronze Age Eurasian migrations". Proceedings of the National Academy of Sciences of the United States of America. 114 (10). National Academy of Sciences: 2657–2662. Bibcode:2017PNAS..114.2657G. doi:10.1073/pnas.1616392114. PMC 5347611. PMID 28223527.
- Haak, Wolfgang; Lazaridis, Iosif (2 March 2015). "Massive migration from the steppe was a source for Indo-European languages in Europe". Nature. 522 (7555). Nature Research: 207–211. arXiv:1502.02783. Bibcode:2015Natur.522..207H. doi:10.1038/nature14317. PMC 5048219. PMID 25731166.
- Jones, Eppie R.; Gonzalez-Fortes, Gloria (16 November 2015). "Upper Palaeolithic genomes reveal deep roots of modern Eurasians". Nature Communications. 6 (8912). Nature Research: 8912. Bibcode:2015NatCo...6.8912J. doi:10.1038/ncomms9912. PMC 4660371. PMID 26567969.
- Jones, Eppie R.; Zarina, Gunita (20 February 2017). "The Neolithic Transition in the Baltic Was Not Driven by Admixture with Early European Farmers". Current Biology. 27 (4). Cell Press: 576–582. Bibcode:2017CBio...27..576J. doi:10.1016/j.cub.2016.12.060. PMC 5321670. PMID 28162894.
- Juras, Anna; Chyleński, Maciej (2 August 2018). "Mitochondrial genomes reveal an east to west cline of steppe ancestry in Corded Ware populations". Scientific Reports. 8 (11603). Nature Research: 11603. Bibcode:2018NatSR...811603J. doi:10.1038/s41598-018-29914-5. PMC 6072757. PMID 30072694.
- Lazaridis, Iosif; Patterson, Nick (17 September 2014). "Ancient human genomes suggest three ancestral populations for present-day Europeans". Nature. 513 (7518). Nature Research: 409–413. arXiv:1312.6639. Bibcode:2014Natur.513..409L. doi:10.1038/nature13673. PMC 4170574. PMID 25230663.
- Lipson, Mark; Szécsényi-Nagy, Anna (8 November 2017). "Parallel palaeogenomic transects reveal complex genetic history of early European farmers". Nature. 551 (7680). Nature Research: 368–372. Bibcode:2017Natur.551..368L. doi:10.1038/nature24476. PMC 5973800. PMID 29144465.
- Malmström, Helena; Linderholm, Anna (19 January 2015). "Ancient mitochondrial DNA from the northern fringe of the Neolithic farming expansion in Europe sheds light on the dispersion process". Proceedings of the Royal Society B. 370 (1660). Royal Society. doi:10.1098/rstb.2013.0373. PMC 4275881. PMID 25487325.
- Marcus, Joseph H.; Posth, Cosimo (24 February 2020). "Genetic history from the Middle Neolithic to present on the Mediterranean island of Sardinia". Nature Communications. 11 (939). Nature Research: 939. Bibcode:2020NatCo..11..939M. doi:10.1038/s41467-020-14523-6. PMC 7039977. PMID 32094358.
- Martiniano, Rui; Cassidy, Lara M. (27 July 2017). "The population genomics of archaeological transition in west Iberia: Investigation of ancient substructure using imputation and haplotype-based methods". PLOS Genetics. 13 (7) e1006852. PLOS. doi:10.1371/journal.pgen.1006852. PMC 5531429. PMID 28749934.
- Mathieson, Iain; Lazaridis, Iosif (23 November 2015). "Genome-wide patterns of selection in 230 ancient Eurasians". Nature. 528 (7583). Nature Research: 499–503. Bibcode:2015Natur.528..499M. doi:10.1038/nature16152. PMC 4918750. PMID 26595274.
- Mathieson, Iain; Alpaslan-Roodenberg, Songül (21 February 2018). "The genomic history of southeastern Europe". Nature. 555 (7695). Nature Research: 197–203. Bibcode:2018Natur.555..197M. doi:10.1038/nature25778. PMC 6091220. PMID 29466330.
- Olalde, Iñigo; Schroeder, Hannes (2 September 2015). "A Common Genetic Origin for Early Farmers from Mediterranean Cardial and Central European LBK Cultures". PLOS Genetics. 32 (12). PLOS: 3132–3142. doi:10.1093/molbev/msv181. PMC 4652622. PMID 26337550.
- Olalde, Iñigo; Mallick, Swapan (15 March 2019). "The genomic history of the Iberian Peninsula over the past 8000 years". Science. 363 (6432). American Association for the Advancement of Science: 1230–1234. Bibcode:2019Sci...363.1230O. doi:10.1126/science.aav4040. PMC 6436108. PMID 30872528.
- Rivollat, Maïté; Jeong, Choongwon (29 May 2020). "Ancient genome-wide DNA from France highlights the complexity of interactions between Mesolithic hunter-gatherers and Neolithic farmers". Science. 6 (22) eaaz5344. American Association for the Advancement of Science. Bibcode:2020SciA....6.5344R. doi:10.1126/sciadv.aaz5344. PMC 7259947. PMID 32523989.
- Saag, Lehti; Varul, Liivi (24 July 2017). "Extensive Farming in Estonia Started through a Sex-Biased Migration from the Steppe". Current Biology. 27 (14). Cell Press: 2185–2193. Bibcode:2017CBio...27E2185S. doi:10.1016/j.cub.2017.06.022. PMID 28712569.
- Sánchez-Quinto, Federico; Malmström, Helena (7 May 2019). "Megalithic tombs in western and northern Neolithic Europe were linked to a kindred society". Proceedings of the National Academy of Sciences of the United States of America. 116 (19). National Academy of Sciences: 9469–9474. Bibcode:2019PNAS..116.9469S. doi:10.1073/pnas.1818037116. PMC 6511028. PMID 30988179.
