= Anatolian hunter-gatherers =

Ancient population in Anatolia

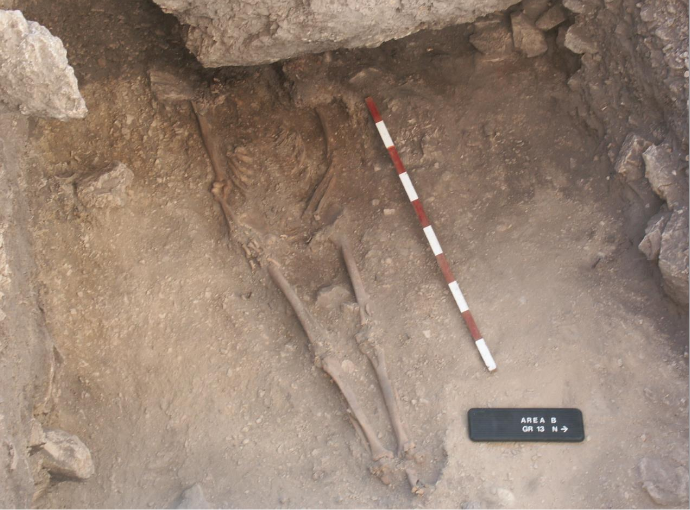
- Remains of the first Anatolian hunter-gatherer discovered. Dated at 13,642-13,073 cal BCE.
- Period: Upper Paleolithic, Mesolithic
- Dates: 15,000–8,000 BP

Anatolian hunter-gatherer (AHG) is a distinct anatomically modern human archaeogenetic lineage, first identified in a 2019 study based on the remains of a single Epipaleolithic individual found in central Anatolia, radiocarbon dated to around 13,500 BCE. A population related to this individual was the main source of the ancestry of later Anatolian Neolithic Farmers (hunter gatherers who adopted farming, and later gave rise to a branch that migrated into Europe, becoming known as Early European Farmers), who along with Western Hunter Gatherers (WHG), Eastern Hunter Gatherers (EHG) and Western Steppe Herders (WSH) are one of the currently known ancestral genetic contributors to present-day Europeans.

== Introduction ==
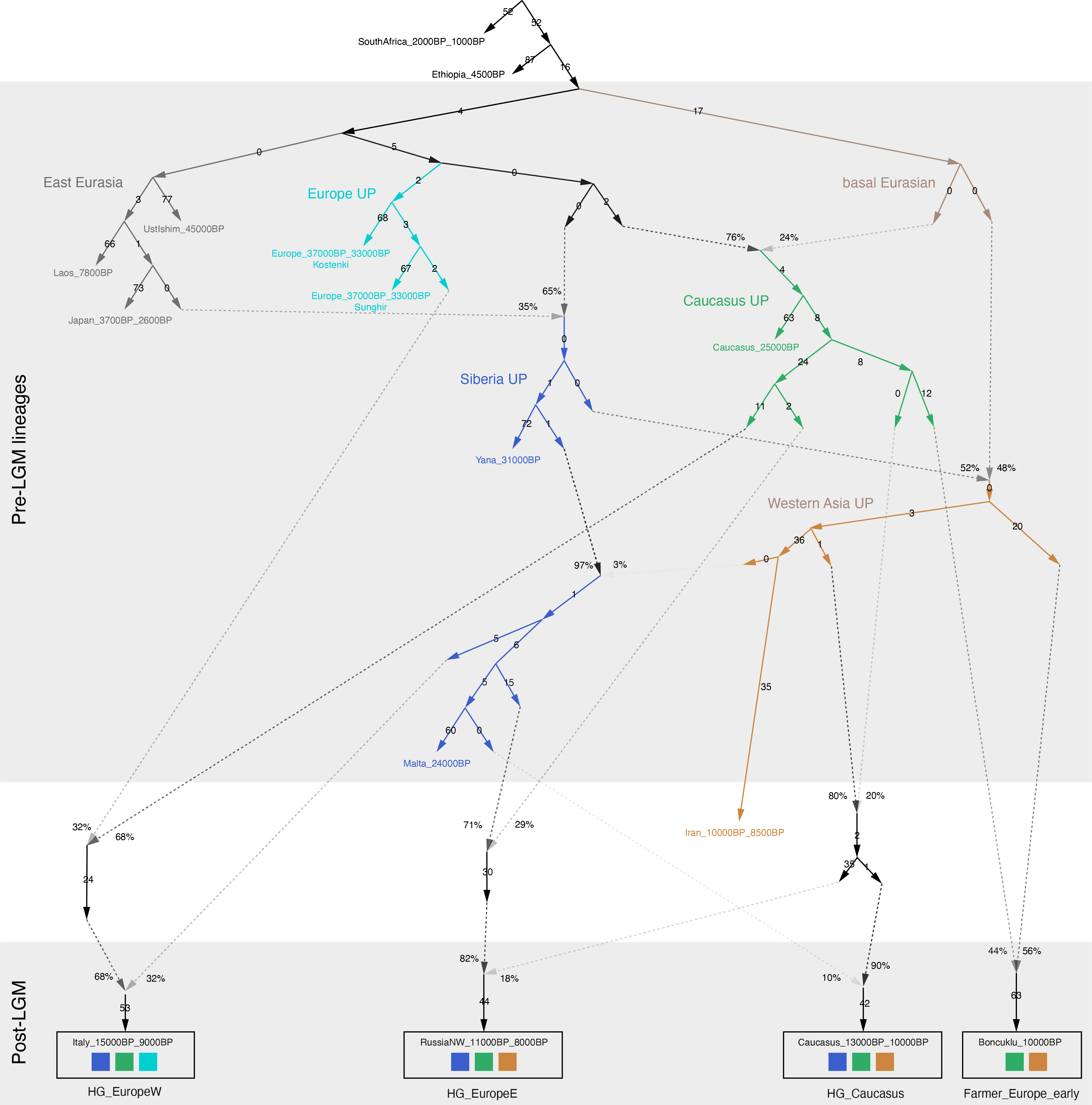
Admixture graph of deep Eurasian lineages (Allentoft et al. 2024).

The existence of this ancient population has been inferred through the genetic analysis of the remains of a man from the site of Pınarbaşı (37 ° 29'N, 33 ° 02'E), in central Anatolia, which has been dated at 13,642-13,073 cal BCE. This population is genetically differentiated from the rest of the known Pleistocene populations.

It has been discovered that populations of the Anatolian Neolithic (Anatolian Neolithic Farmers) derive most of their ancestry from the AHG, with minor gene flow from Iranian/Caucasus and Levantine sources, suggesting that agriculture was adopted in situ by these hunter-gatherers and not spread by demic diffusion into the region.

The Anatolian hunter-gatherers began farming around 8300 BC, at places such as Çayönü. Cows, sheep and goats may have been domesticated first in southern Turkey. These farmers moved into Thrace (now European Turkey) around 7000 BC.

== Genetics ==
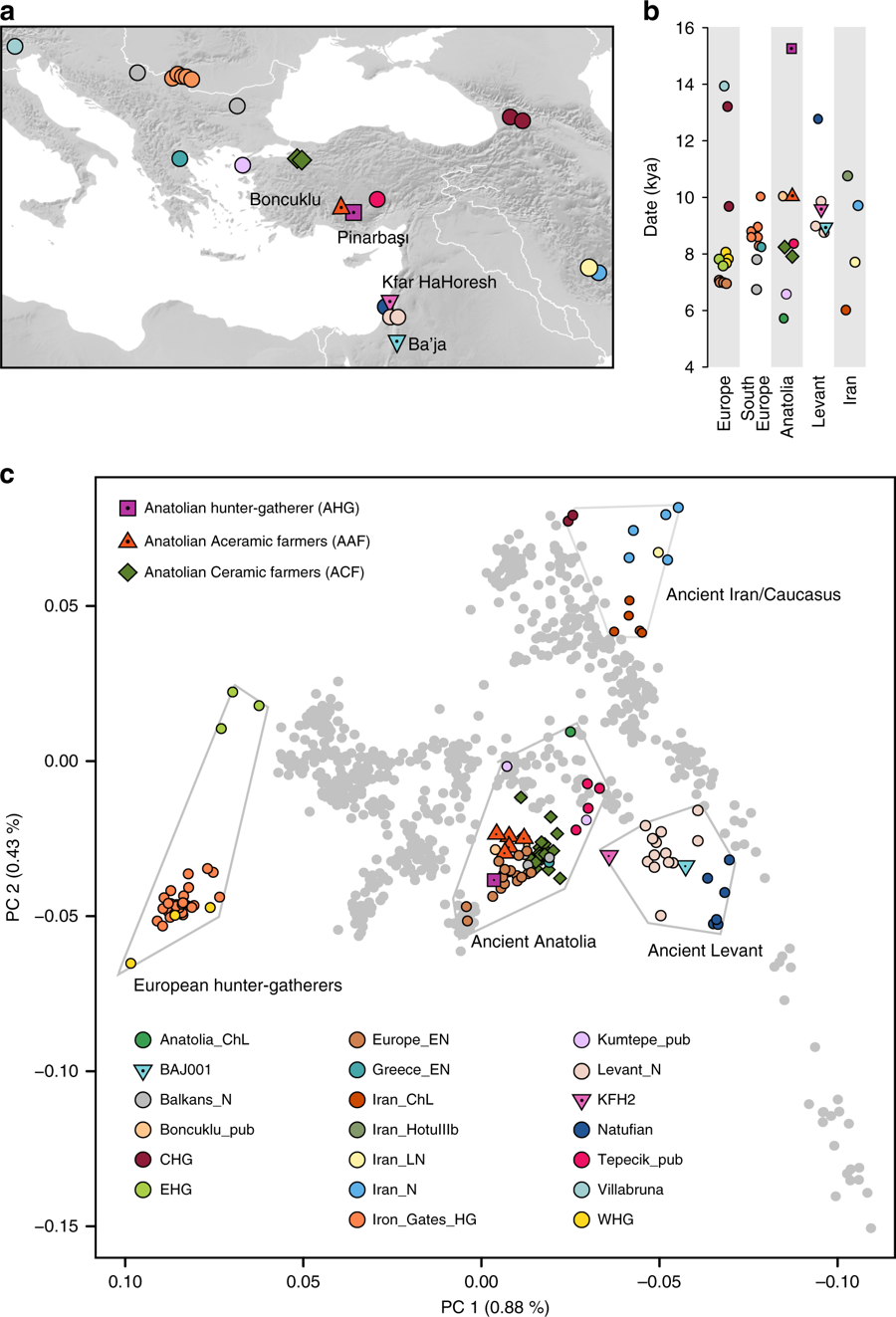
Principal component analysis, location and datation of the individuals analyzed in Feldman et al. (2019). The PCA shows the genetic affinities of Anatolian hunter-gatherers with other ancient populations.

At the autosomal level, in the Principal component analysis (PCA) the analyzed AHG individual turns out to be close to two later Anatolian populations, the Anatolian Aceramic Farmers (AAF) dating from 8300-7800 BCE, and the Anatolian Ceramic Farmers (ACF) dating from 7000-6000 BCE. These early Anatolian farmers later replaced the European hunter-gatherer populations in Europe to a large extent, ultimately becoming one of the main genetic contributions to current European populations, especially those of the Mediterranean. In addition, their position in this analysis is intermediate between Natufian farmers and Western Hunter-Gatherers (WHG). This last point is confirmed by the ADMIXTURE and qp-Adm analysis and confirms the presence of hunter-gatherers of both European and Near-Eastern origins in Central Anatolia in the late Pleistocene. Mesolithic individuals from the Balkans, known as Iron Gates Hunter-Gatherers, are the most genetically similar group to the Anatolian Hunter-Gatherer lineage. Feldman et al. suggest that this affinity is not due to a genetic flow from the AHG to the ancestors of the Villabruna cluster, but on the contrary: there was a genetic flow from the ancestors of the Villabruna cluster to the ancestors of the AHG.

Other genetic studies explain the affinities between AHG and WHG/Natufian hunter-gatherers by their shared input from hunter-gatherers associated with the Upper Paleolithic of the Caucasus. According to a 2024 study, the AHG received roughly equal genetic contributions from a Natufian-related Levantine population and a population related to Late Upper Paleolithic Europeans. This admixture occurred shortly after the Last Glacial Maximum, around 14.2 ka cal BP.

The presence of Neolithic Anatolian ancestry among modern populations of the Levant and Iraq can be attributed to post-Bronze Age migrations.

=== Uniparental markers ===
The individual analyzed belongs to Y-chromosomal haplogroup C1a2 (C-V20), which has been found in some of the early WHGs, and mitochondrial haplogroup K2b. Both paternal and maternal lineages are rare in present-day Eurasian populations.

== See also ==
- Early European Farmers
- Genetic history of the Middle East

== Bibliography ==
- Feldman, Michal; Fernández-Domínguez, Eva; Reynolds, Luke; Baird, Douglas; Pearson, Jessica; Hershkovitz, Israel; May, Hila; Goring-Morris, Nigel; Benz, Marion; Gresky, Julia; Bianco, Raffaela A.; Fairbairn, Andrew; Mustafaoğlu, Gökhan; Stockhammer, Philipp W.; Posth, Cosimo (2019). "Late Pleistocene human genome suggests a local origin for the first farmers of central Anatolia". Nature Communications. 10 (1): 1218. Bibcode:2019NatCo..10.1218F. doi:10.1038/s41467-019-09209-7. ISSN 2041-1723. PMC 6425003. PMID 30890703.
