= Western Steppe Herders =

Archaeogenetic name for an ancestral genetic component

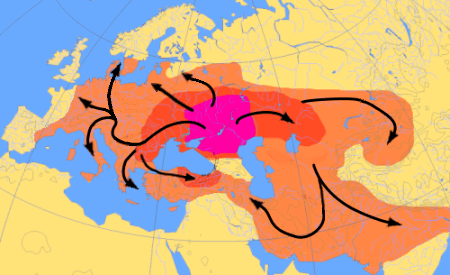
Scheme of Indo-European migrations from c. 4000 to 1000 BC according to the widely held Kurgan hypothesis. These migrations are thought to have spread WSH ancestry and Indo-European languages throughout large parts of Eurasia.

In archaeogenetics, the term Western Steppe Herders (WSH), or Western Steppe Pastoralists, is the name given to a distinct ancestral component first identified in individuals from the Chalcolithic steppe around the start of the 5th millennium BC, subsequently detected in several genetically similar or directly related ancient populations including the Khvalynsk, Repin, Sredny Stog, and Yamnaya cultures, and found in substantial levels in contemporary populations of Europe, Central Asia, South Asia, and West Asia. (Note: "North of the Caucasus, Eneolithic and BA individuals from the Samara region (5200–4000 BCE) carry an equal mixture of EHG and CHG/Iranian ancestry, so-called 'steppe ancestry' that eventually spread further west, where it contributed substantially to present-day Europeans, and east to the Altai region as well as to South Asia.") (Note: "Recent paleogenomic studies have shown that migrations of Western steppe herders (WSH) beginning in the Eneolithic (ca. 3300–2700 BCE) profoundly transformed the genes and cultures of Europe and central Asia... The migration of these Western steppe herders (WSH), with the Yamnaya horizon (ca. 3300–2700 BCE) as their earliest representative, contributed not only to the European Corded Ware culture (ca. 2500–2200 BCE) but also to steppe cultures located between the Caspian Sea and the Altai-Sayan mountain region, such as the Afanasievo (ca. 3300–2500 BCE) and later Sintashta (2100–1800 BCE) and Andronovo (1800–1300 BCE) cultures.") This ancestry is often referred to as Yamnaya ancestry, Yamnaya-related ancestry, Steppe ancestry, or Steppe-related ancestry.

Western Steppe Herders are considered to be descended from a merger between Eastern Hunter-Gatherers (EHGs) and Caucasus Hunter-Gatherers (CHGs). The WSH component is modeled as an admixture of EHG and CHG ancestral components in roughly equal proportions, with the majority of the Y-DNA haplogroup contribution from EHG males. The Y-DNA haplogroups of Western Steppe Herder males are not uniform, with the Yamnaya culture individuals mainly belonging to R1b-Z2103 with a minority of I2a2, the earlier Khvalynsk culture also with mainly R1b but also some R1a, Q1a, J, and I2a2, and the later, high WSH ancestry Corded Ware culture individuals mainly belonging to haplogroup R1b in the earliest samples, with R1a-M417 becoming predominant over time.

Around 3,000 BC, people of the Yamnaya culture or a closely related group, who had high levels of WSH ancestry with some additional Neolithic farmer admixture, embarked on a massive expansion throughout Eurasia, which is considered to be associated with the dispersal of at least some of the Indo-European languages by most contemporary linguists, archaeologists, and geneticists. WSH ancestry from this period is often referred to as Steppe Early and Middle Bronze Age (Steppe EMBA) ancestry. (Note: "We collectively refer to as "Western Steppe Herders (WSH)": the earlier populations associated with the Yamnaya and Afanasievo cultures (often called "steppe Early and Middle Bronze Age"; "steppe_EMBA") and the later ones associated with many cultures such as Potapovka, Sintashta, Srubnaya and Andronovo to name a few (often called "steppe Middle and Late Bronze Age"; "steppe_MLBA").")

This migration is linked to the origin of both the Corded Ware culture, whose members were of about 75% WSH ancestry, and the Bell Beaker ("Eastern group"), who were around 50% WSH ancestry, though the exact relationships between these groups remains uncertain.

The expansion of WSHs resulted in the virtual disappearance of the Y-DNA of Early European Farmers (EEFs) from the European gene pool, significantly altering the cultural and genetic landscape of Europe. During the Bronze Age, Corded Ware people with admixture from Central Europe remigrated onto the steppe, forming the Sintashta culture and a type of WSH ancestry often referred to as Steppe Middle and Late Bronze Age (Steppe MLBA) or Sintashta-related ancestry.

The modern population of Europe can largely be modeled as a mixture of WHG (Western Hunter-Gatherers), EEF (Early European Farmers), and WSH (Western Steppe Herders), with proportions varying among different Indo-European groups such as Balts, Slavs, Germanics, and others. Contemporary Indo-Aryans of South Asia, especially upper caste populations, can largely be modeled as a mix of Bronze Age Steppe and Indus Periphery (Iranian hunter-gatherer and AASI) ancestry, with proportions varying among different communities. In contrast, non-Indo-European South Asian Dravidian populations show significant extra AASI (Ancient Ancestral South Indian) and Indus Periphery ancestry also, with relatively less Steppe contribution.

WSH ancestry peaks in Northern Europe, particularly among Irish people, Norwegians, Swedes, Belarusians, Lithuanians, Scots and Icelanders. In South Asia, WSH ancestry reaches its highest levels in the northern Indian subcontinent, especially among Kalash, Ror, Jat, Brahmin and Bhumihar. Modern-day south-central Asians, particularly the Yaghnobis and Tajiks, both Eastern Iranian peoples, exhibit strong genetic continuity with Iron Age Central Asians (Indo-Iranians). They may serve as proxies for the source of "Steppe ancestry" found among many Central Asian and Middle Eastern (or West Asian) groups, who also carry a significant BMAC (Bactria–Margiana Archaeological Complex) genetic component.

== Summary ==
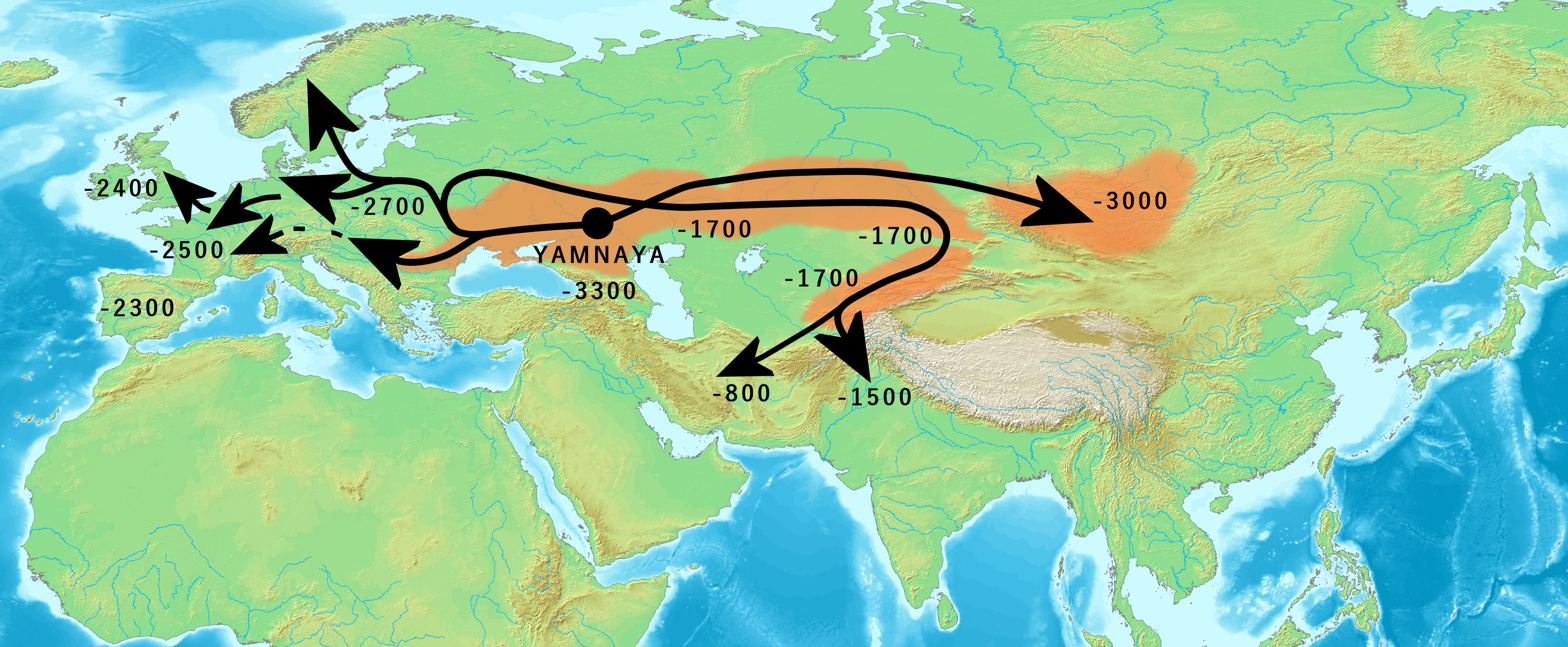
Migration of Yamnaya-related people, according to Anthony (2007), (2017); Narasimhan et al. (2019); Nordqvist & Heyd (2020): 3000 BC: Initial eastward migration initiating the Afanasievo culture, possibly Proto-Tocharian.; 2900 BC: North-westward migrations carrying Corded Ware culture, transforming into Bell Beaker; according to Anthony, westward migration west of Carpatians into Hungary as Yamnaya, transforming into Bell Beaker, possibly ancestral to Italo-Celtic (disputed).; 2700 BC: Second eastward migration starting east of Carpatian mountains as Corded Ware, transforming into Fatyanovo-Balanova; (2800 BCE) -> Abashevo; (2200 BCE) -> Sintashta; (2100-1900 BCE) -> Andronovo; (1900-1700 BCE) -> Indo-Aryans.

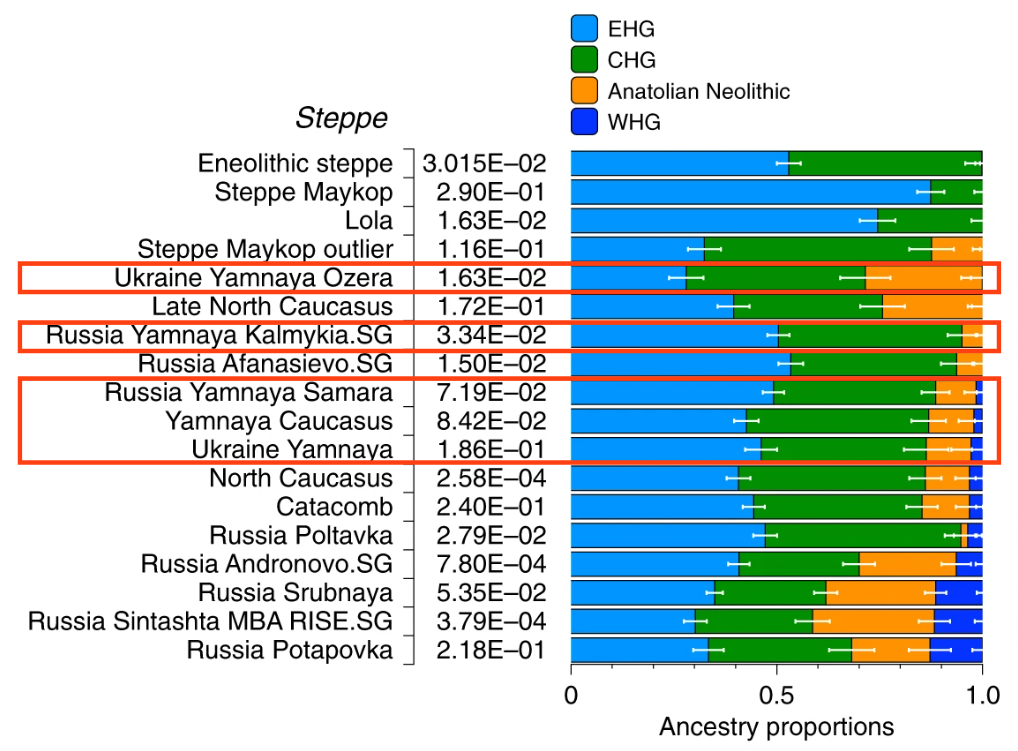
Admixture proportions of Yamnaya populations. They combined Eastern Hunter Gatherer ( EHG), Caucasian Hunter-Gatherer ( CHG), Anatolian Neolithic ( ) and Western Hunter Gatherer ( WHG) ancestry.

A summary of several genetic studies published in Nature and Cell during the year 2015 is given by Heyd (2017):

- Western Steppe Herders component "is lower in southern Europe and higher in northern Europe", where inhabitants have roughly 50% WSH ancestry on average. (Haak et al. 2015; Lazaridis et al. 2016)
- It is linked to the migrations of Yamnaya populations dated to ca. 3000 BC (Allentoft et al. 2015; Haak et al. 2015);
- Third-millennium Europe (and prehistoric Europe in general) was "a highly dynamic period involving large-scale population migrations and replacement" (Allentoft et al. 2015);
- The Yamnaya migrations are linked to the spread of Indo-European languages (Allentoft et al. 2015; Haak et al. 2015);
- The plague (Yersinia pestis) spread into Europe during the third millennium BC (Rasmussen et al. 2015), and it stemmed from migrations from the Eurasian steppes;
- Yamnaya peoples have the highest ever calculated genetic selection for stature (Mathieson et al. 2015);

== Nomenclature and definition ==
'Steppe ancestry' can be classified into at least three distinctive clusters. In its simplest and earliest form, it can be modelled as an admixture of two highly divergent ancestral components; a population related to Eastern Hunter-Gatherers (EHG) as the original inhabitants of the European steppe in the Mesolithic, and a population related to Caucasus Hunter-Gatherers (CHG) that had spread northwards from the Near East. This ancestry profile is known as 'Eneolithic Steppe' ancestry, or 'pre-Yamnaya ancestry', and is represented by ancient individuals from the Khvalynsk II and Progress 2 archaeological sites. These individuals are chronologically intermediate between EHGs and the later Yamnaya population, and harbour very variable proportions of CHG ancestry.

The later Yamnaya population can be modelled as an admixed EHG-related/CHG-related population with additional (c. 14%) Anatolian Farmer ancestry with some Western Hunter-Gatherer admixture, or alternatively can be modelled as a mixture of EHG, CHG, and Iranian Chalcolithic ancestries. This ancestry profile is not found in the earlier Eneolithic steppe or Steppe Maykop populations. In addition to individuals of the Yamnaya culture, very similar ancestry is also found in individuals of the closely related Afanasievo culture near the Altai Mountains and the Poltavka culture on the Middle Bronze Age steppe. This genetic component is known as Steppe Early to Middle Bronze Age (Steppe EMBA), or Yamnaya-related ancestry.

Expansions of Yamnaya-related populations to Eastern and Central Europe resulted in the formation of populations with admixed EMBA Steppe and Early European Farmer ancestry, such as the ancient individuals of the Corded Ware and Bell beaker cultures. In the eastern Corded Ware culture, the Fatyanovo-Balanovo group may have been the source of a back migration onto the steppe and further to the east, resulting in the formation of the Srubnaya, Sintashta, and Andronovo cultures. The genetic cluster represented by ancient individuals from these cultures is known as Steppe Middle to Late Bronze Age (Steppe MLBA) ancestry.

== Origins and expansion ==
=== Steppe Eneolithic ===
The precise location of the initial formation of so-called 'Eneolithic steppe' ancestry, which can be modeled as a relatively simple admixture of EHG and CHG-related populations, remains uncertain. Admixture between populations with Near Eastern ancestry and the EHG on the Pontic-Caspian steppe had begun by the fifth millennium BC, predating the Yamnaya culture by at least 1,000 years.

This early, 'pre-Yamnaya' ancestry was first detected in Eneolithic individuals at the Khvalynsk II cemetery and directly north of the Caucasus mountains at the Progress 2 archaeological site; this ancestry is also detected in individuals of the Steppe Maykop culture, but with additional Siberian and Native American-related admixture.

The individuals from Khvalynsk comprise a genetically heterogeneous population, with some more similar to EHGs and others closer to the later Yamnaya population. On average, these individuals can be modelled as around three-quarters EHG and one-quarter Near Eastern ("Armenian related") ancestry. These three individuals belong to Y-chromosome haplogroups R1a (which is not found in later elite Yamnaya graves), R1b, and Q1a, the first two of which are found in preceding EHG populations, which suggests continuity with the preceding EHG population.

Three individuals from the Progress 2 site in the foothills north of the Caucasus also harbour EHG and CHG related ancestry, and are genetically similar to Eneolithic individuals from Khvalynsk II but with higher levels of CHG-related ancestry that are comparable to the later Yamnaya population.

Archaeologist David Anthony speculates that the Khvalynsk/Progress-2 mating network, located between the middle Volga and the North Caucasus foothills, makes a "plausible genetic ancestor for Yamnaya".

=== Steppe Early to Middle Bronze Age ===
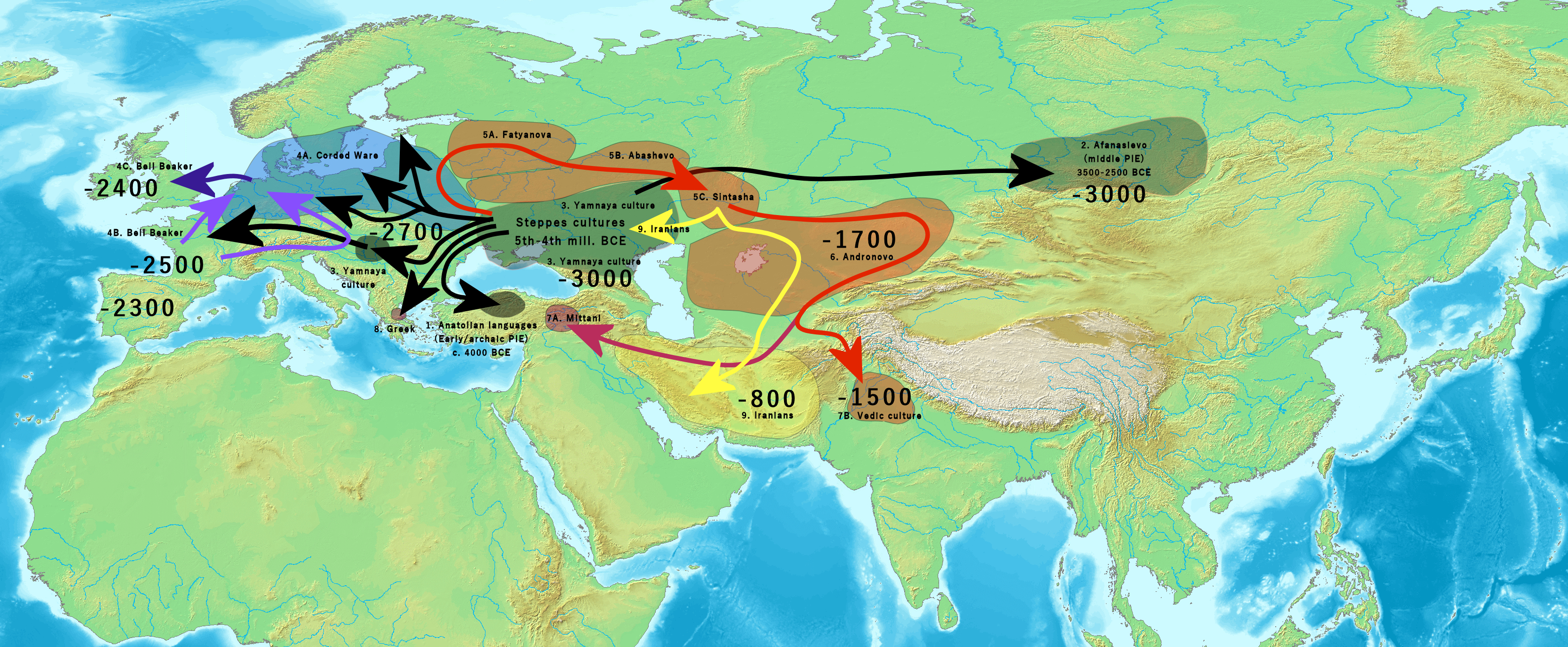
Scheme of Indo-European migrations from c. 3000 to 800 BC

Early Yamnaya individuals, the Afanasievo population, and the individuals of the Poltavka and Catacomb cultures that followed the Yamnaya on the steppe comprise a genetically almost indistinguishable cluster, carrying predominantly R1b Y-DNA haplogroups with a minority of I2a.

When the first Yamnaya whole genome sequences were published in 2015, Yamnaya individuals were reported to have no Anatolian Farmer ancestry, but following larger studies it is now generally agreed that Yamnaya had around 14% Anatolian Farmer ancestry, with an additional small WHG component, which was not present in the previous Eneolithic steppe individuals.

The actual populations involved in the formation of the Yamnaya cluster remain uncertain. Proposed models have included admixture of an EHG/CHG population with European Farmers to the west (such as those of the Globular Amphorae culture or a genetically similar population), a two-way admixture of EHGs with an Iran Chalcolithic population, and a three-way admixture of EHG, CHG, and Iran Chalcolithic populations.

Lazaridis et al.(2022)conclude that Yamnaya ancestry can be modelled as a mixture of an as yet unsampled admixed EHG/CHG population with a second source from the south Caucasus, and rejects Khvalynsk Eneolithic as a source population for the Yamnaya cluster. The study also contradicts suggestions that European farmer populations of the Cucuteni-Trypillia and Globular Amphora cultures contributed ancestry to Yamnaya, because Yamnaya lack the additional hunter-gatherer ancestry found in European farmers, and carry equal proportions of Anatolian and Levantine ancestry, unlike European farmers who carry predominantly Anatolian ancestry.

=== Corded Ware and Bell Beaker ===
Genetic evidence demonstrates a major and relatively sudden population turnover in Europe during the early third millennium BC, resulting in the rapid spread of steppe ancestry along with the Corded Ware and Bell Beaker cultures.

Corded Ware individuals have been shown to be genetically distinct from preceding European Neolithic cultures of North-Central and Northeastern Europe, with around 75% of their ancestry derived from a Yamnaya-like population.

The earliest Corded Ware individuals are genetically close to Yamnaya. Admixture with local Neolithic populations resulted in later individuals genetically intermediate between Yamnaya and individuals of the Globular Amphora Culture.

A 2021 study suggests that Early Corded Ware from Bohemia can be modelled as a three way mixture of Yamnaya-like and European Neolithic-like populations, with an additional c. 5% to 15% contribution from a northeast European Eneolithic forest-steppe group (such as Pitted Ware, Latvia Middle Neolithic, Ukraine Neolithic, or a genetically similar population), a cluster the authors term 'Forest Steppe' ancestry.

In the Bell Beaker culture, high proportions (c. 50%) of steppe related ancestry are found in individuals from Germany, the Czech Republic, and Britain. The genetic turnover is most substantial in Britain, where around 90% of the gene pool was replaced within a few hundred years.

The earliest Bell Beaker individuals from Bohemia harbouring Steppe ancestry are genetically similar to Corded Ware individuals, which suggests continuity between these two groups. Later Bell Beaker individuals have an additional c. 20% Middle Eneolithic ancestry.

=== Steppe Middle to Late Bronze Age ===
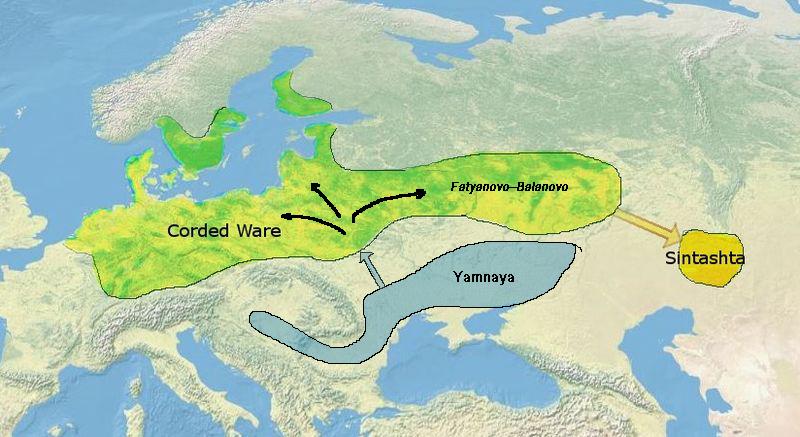
The eastern part of the Corded Ware culture contributed to the Sintashta culture (c. 2100–1800 BC), where the Indo-Iranian languages and culture emerged.

Bronze Age individuals from the Sintashta culture in the southern Urals and the closely related Andronovo culture in Central Asia, as well as the Srubnaya culture on the Pontic Caspian steppe, all carry substantial levels of Yamnaya-related ancestry, with additional European Farmer admixture, an ancestry known as Steppe Middle to Late Bronze Age ancestry (Steppe MLBA), which developed with the formation of the Corded Ware culture who may also be included in this cluster. Individuals from the Sintashta, Andronovo, and Srubnaya cultures are all genetically similar and may ultimately descend from a secondary migration of the Fatyanovo population, an eastern Corded Ware group.

According to Narsimhan et al. (2019), this Steppe MLBA cluster may be further divided into a 'Western Steppe MLBA cluster', who may be modelled as around two thirds Yamnaya-related ancestry and one third European Farmer ancestry, and a 'Central Steppe MLBA cluster', which can be modelled as Western MLBA with around 9% West Siberian Hunter Gatherer (WSHG) ancestry. It has been suggested that the Central Steppe MLBA cluster was the main vector for the spread of Yamnaya-related ancestry to South Asia in the early 2nd millennium BC. However, according to Pathak et al. (2018), the "North-Western Indian & Pakistani" populations (PNWI) not only showed significant Middle-Late Bronze Age Steppe (Steppe_MLBA) ancestry but also Yamnaya Early-Middle Bronze Age (Steppe_EMBA) ancestry, whereas the Indo-Europeans of the Gangetic Plains and the Dravidian people showed significant Yamnaya (Steppe_EMBA) ancestry but no Steppe_MLBA.

== Genetics ==
The American archaeologist David W. Anthony (2019) summarized the recent genetic data on WSHs. Anthony notes that WSHs display genetic continuity between the paternal lineages of the Dnieper-Donets culture and the Yamnaya culture, as the males of both cultures have been found to have been mostly carriers of R1b, and to a lesser extent I2.

While the mtDNA of the Dnieper-Donets people is exclusively types of U, which is associated with EHGs and WHGs, the mtDNA of the Yamnaya also includes types frequent among CHGs and EEFs. Anthony notes that WSH had earlier been found among the Sredny Stog culture and the Khvalynsk culture, who preceded the Yamnaya culture on the Pontic–Caspian steppe. The Sredny Stog were mostly WSH with slight EEF admixture, while the Khvalynsk living further east were purely WSH. Anthony also notes that unlike their Khvalynsk predecessors, the Y-DNA of the Yamnaya is exclusively EHG and WHG. This implies that the leading clans of the Yamnaya were of EHG and WHG origin.

Because the slight EEF ancestry of the WSHs has been found to be derived from Central Europe, and because there is no CHG Y-DNA detected among the Yamnaya, Anthony notes that it is impossible for the Maikop culture to have contributed much to the culture or CHG ancestry of the WSHs. Anthony suggests that admixture between EHGs and CHGs first occurred on the eastern Pontic-Caspian steppe around 5,000 BC, while admixture with EEFs happened in the southern parts of the Pontic-Caspian steppe sometime later.

As Yamnaya Y-DNA is exclusively of the EHG and WHG type, Anthony notes that the admixture must have occurred between EHG and WHG males, and CHG and EEF females. Anthony cites this as additional evidence that the Indo-European languages were initially spoken among EHGs living in Eastern Europe. On this basis, Anthony concludes that the Indo-European languages which the WSHs brought with them were initially the result of "a dominant language spoken by EHGs that absorbed Caucasus-like elements in phonology, morphology, and lexicon" (spoken by CHGs).

During the Chalcolithic and early Bronze Age, the Early European Farmer (EEF) cultures of Europe were overwhelmed by successive migrations of WSHs. These migrations led to EEF paternal DNA lineages in Europe being almost entirely replaced with EHG/WSH paternal DNA (mainly R1b and R1a). EEF mtDNA however remained frequent, suggesting admixture between WSH males and EEF females.

== Phenotypes ==
Early Bronze Age Steppe populations such as the Yamnaya are believed to have had mostly intermediate complexions, brown eyes and dark hair, while the people of the Corded Ware culture had a higher proportion of blue eyes, most probably due to admixture with Western Hunter-Gatherers, who were predominantly blue-eyed. In Europe, besides WHG, Western Steppe Herders also admixed heavily with EEF (Early European Farmers), who, unlike WHG, were light skinned, with the derived SLC24A5 being fixed in the Anatolia Neolithic. This admixture resulted in an increase in lighter phenotypes among later Proto-Indo-Iranian Sintashta_MLBA populations (blond hair ~38.5%, blue eyes ~30.8%, pale skin ~7.7%), as well as in parallel Sintashta-like steppe cultures, with this trend peaking in the Beaker culture ancestral to Celtic and some Germanic groups. However, Lazaridis et al. (2022) indicate that the composite phenotype of blond hair, blue eyes, and pale skin was extremely rare in a single individual, even across later Bronze Age steppe populations. The same study also suggested that the skin tone of early WSH peoples had brown eyes, brown hair, and intermediate complexions. The authors noted that the use of an "intermediate" skin tone phenotype, are those commonly found in present-day Mediterranean populations, as opposed to "pale" ones in present-day Northern Europeans, with the latter being the result of continuous selection pressure across time.

The rs12821256 allele of the KITLG gene that controls melanocyte development and melanin synthesis, which is associated with blond hair and first found in an Ancient North Eurasian individual from Siberia dated to around 15,000 BC, is later found in three Eastern Hunter-Gatherers from Samara, Motala and Ukraine, and several later individuals with WSH ancestry. Geneticist David Reich concludes that the massive migration of people bearing Ancient North Eurasian ancestry probably brought this mutation to Europe, explaining why there are hundreds of millions of copies of this SNP in modern Europeans.

In general, the inhabitants of the Southern Arc had darker pigmentation on average than those of the north (Europe outside the Southern Arc and the Eurasian steppe). When examining composite pigmentation phenotypes, researchers observed that while average pigmentation did indeed differentiate between populations of the Southern Arc and the north, light phenotypes were found in both areas at similar early dates, growing in parallel in the more recent millennia of history, making light pigmentation in West Eurasia the result of constant selection pressure across time.

A study in 2015 found that Yamnaya had the highest ever calculated genetic selection for height of any of the ancient populations tested. A 2024 study argues that the different amounts of Yamnaya/Steppe-like ancestry in Northern and Southern Europeans is responsible for the difference in height. In addition, "based on osteological evidence, the Yamnaya people were tall and had dolichocephalic crania (the average male was 175.5 centimetres (69.1 in) in height), while the representatives of Catacomb culture were stockier and had more brachycephalic crania."

== Lactase persistence ==
In one study, five ancient DNA samples from Yamnaya sites had a frequency of over 25% of an allele that is associated with lactase persistence, conferring lactose tolerance into adulthood. Steppe-derived populations, such as the Yamnaya, are thought to have brought this trait to Europe from the Eurasian steppe, and it is hypothesized that it may have given them a biological advantage over the European populations who lacked it.

Eurasian Steppe populations display higher frequencies of the lactose tolerance allele than European farmers and hunter gatherers who lacked steppe admixture.

== See also ==
- Scandinavian Hunter-Gatherer

== Bibliography ==
- Allentoft, Morten E.; Sikora, Martin; Sjögren, Karl-Göran; Rasmussen, Simon; Rasmussen, Morten; Stenderup, Jesper; Damgaard, Peter B.; Schroeder, Hannes; Ahlström, Torbjörn; Vinner, Lasse; et al. (2015). "Population genomics of Bronze Age Eurasia". Nature. 522 (7555): 167–172. Bibcode:2015Natur.522..167A. doi:10.1038/nature14507. hdl:11104/0248164. ISSN 1476-4687. PMID 26062507. S2CID 4399103.
- Anthony, David (Spring–Summer 2019a). "Archaeology, Genetics, and Language in the Steppes: A Comment on Bomhard". Journal of Indo-European Studies. 47 (1–2): 1–23.
- Anthony, David W. (2019b). "Ancient DNA, Mating Networks, and the Anatolian Split". In Serangeli, Matilde; Olander, Thomas (eds.). Dispersals and Diversification: Linguistic and Archaeological Perspectives on the Early Stages of Indo-European. BRILL. pp. 21–54. ISBN 978-90-04-41619-2 – via Google Books.
- Antonio, Margaret L.; et al. (November 8, 2019). "Ancient Rome: A genetic crossroads of Europe and the Mediterranean". Science. 366 (6466). American Association for the Advancement of Science: 708–714. Bibcode:2019Sci...366..708A. doi:10.1126/science.aay6826. PMC 7093155. PMID 31699931.
- Damgaard, Peter de Barros; et al. (June 29, 2018). "The first horse herders and the impact of early Bronze Age steppe expansions into Asia". Science. 360 (6396) eaar7711. American Association for the Advancement of Science. Bibcode:2018Sci...360r7711D. doi:10.1126/science.aar7711. PMC 6748862. PMID 29743352.
- Eisenmann, Stefanie; Bánffy, Eszter; van Dommelen, Peter; Hofmann, Kerstin P.; Maran, Joseph; Lazaridis, Iosif; Mittnik, Alissa; McCormick, Michael; Krause, Johannes; Reich, David; Stockhammer, Philipp W. (2018). "Reconciling material cultures in archaeology with genetic data: The nomenclature of clusters emerging from archaeogenomic analysis". Scientific Reports. 8 (1): 13003. Bibcode:2018NatSR...813003E. doi:10.1038/s41598-018-31123-z. ISSN 2045-2322. PMC 6115390. PMID 30158639.
- Fernandes, Daniel M.; et al. (March 21, 2019). "The Arrival of Steppe and Iranian Related Ancestry in the Islands of the Western Mediterranean". bioRxiv 10.1101/584714.
- Gibbons, A. (July 24, 2015). "Revolution in human evolution". Science. 349 (6246): 362–366. Bibcode:2015Sci...349..362G. doi:10.1126/science.349.6246.362. ISSN 0036-8075. PMID 26206910.
- Goldberg, Amy; et al. (March 7, 2017). "Ancient X chromosomes reveal contrasting sex bias in Neolithic and Bronze Age Eurasian migrations". Proceedings of the National Academy of Sciences of the United States of America. 114 (10). National Academy of Sciences: 2657–2662. Bibcode:2017PNAS..114.2657G. doi:10.1073/pnas.1616392114. PMC 5347611. PMID 28223527.
- Haak, Wolfgang; Lazaridis, Iosif; Patterson, Nick; Rohland, Nadin; Mallick, Swapan; Llamas, Bastien; Brandt, Guido; Nordenfelt, Susanne; Harney, Eadaoin; Stewardson, Kristin; et al. (2015). "Massive migration from the steppe was a source for Indo-European languages in Europe". Nature. 522 (7555): 207–211. arXiv:1502.02783. Bibcode:2015Natur.522..207H. doi:10.1038/nature14317. ISSN 1476-4687. PMC 5048219. PMID 25731166.
- Heyd, Volker (April 2017). "Kossinna's smile" (PDF). Antiquity. 91 (356): 348–359. doi:10.15184/aqy.2017.21. hdl:10138/255652. ISSN 0003-598X. S2CID 164376362.
- Heyd, Volker (2019). "Yamnaya – Corded Wares – Bell Beakers, or How to Conceptualize Events of 5000 Years Ago that Shaped Modern Europe". STUDIA IN HONOREM ILIAE ILIEV [Studies in honor of Ilia Iliev] (PDF). News of the Yambol Museum / year VI, issue 9. pp. 125–136. Archived from the original (PDF) on July 7, 2021.
- Jeong, Choongwon; et al. (November 27, 2018). "Bronze Age population dynamics and the rise of dairy pastoralism on the eastern Eurasian steppe". Proceedings of the National Academy of Sciences of the United States of America. 115 (48). National Academy of Sciences: 966–976. Bibcode:2018PNAS..11511248J. doi:10.1073/pnas.1813608115. PMC 6275519. PMID 30397125.
- Jeong, Choongwon; et al. (April 29, 2019). "The genetic history of admixture across inner Eurasia languages in Europe". Nature Ecology and Evolution. 3 (6). Nature Research: 966–976. Bibcode:2019NatEE...3..966J. doi:10.1038/s41559-019-0878-2. PMC 6542712. PMID 31036896.
- Jones, Eppie R.; et al. (November 16, 2015). "Upper Palaeolithic genomes reveal deep roots of modern Eurasians". Nature Communications. 6 (8912) 8912. Nature Research. Bibcode:2015NatCo...6.8912J. doi:10.1038/ncomms9912. PMC 4660371. PMID 26567969.
- Juras, Anna; et al. (August 2, 2018). "Mitochondrial genomes reveal an east to west cline of steppe ancestry in Corded Ware populations". Scientific Reports. 8 (11603). Nature Research: 11603. Bibcode:2018NatSR...811603J. doi:10.1038/s41598-018-29914-5. PMC 6072757. PMID 30072694.
- Lazaridis, Iosif; et al. (July 25, 2016). "Genomic insights into the origin of farming in the ancient Near East". Nature. 536 (7617). Nature Research: 419–424. Bibcode:2016Natur.536..419L. doi:10.1038/nature19310. PMC 5003663. PMID 27459054.
- Lazaridis, Iosif; et al. (August 2, 2017). "Genetic origins of the Minoans and Mycenaeans". Nature. 548 (7666). Nature Research: 214–218. Bibcode:2017Natur.548..214L. doi:10.1038/nature23310. PMC 5565772. PMID 28783727.
- Lazaridis, Iosif; Alpaslan-Roodenberg, Songül; Acar, Ayşe; Açıkkol, Ayşen; Agelarakis, Anagnostis; Aghikyan, Levon; Akyüz, Uğur; Andreeva, Desislava; Andrijašević, Gojko; Antonović, Dragana; Armit, Ian; Atmaca, Alper; Avetisyan, Pavel; Aytek, Ahmet İhsan; Bacvarov, Krum (2022). "The genetic history of the Southern Arc: A bridge between West Asia and Europe". Science. 377 (6609) eabm4247. Bibcode:2022Sci...377m4247L. doi:10.1126/science.abm4247. ISSN 0036-8075. PMC 10064553. PMID 36007055.
- Mallory, J.P. (1991). In Search of the Indo-Europeans: Language Archeology and Myth. Thames & Hudson – via Google Books.
- Malmström, Helena; Günther, Torsten; Svensson, Emma M.; Juras, Anna; Fraser, Magdalena; Munters, Arielle R.; Pospieszny, Łukasz; Tõrv, Mari; Lindström, Jonathan; Götherström, Anders; Storå, Jan; Jakobsson, Mattias (October 9, 2019). "The genomic ancestry of the Scandinavian Battle Axe Culture people and their relation to the broader Corded Ware horizon". Proceedings of the Royal Society B: Biological Sciences. 286 (1912). 20191528. doi:10.1098/rspb.2019.1528. ISSN 0962-8452. PMC 6790770. PMID 31594508.
- Mathieson, Iain; Lazaridis, Iosif; Rohland, Nadin; Mallick, Swapan; Patterson, Nick; Roodenberg, Songül Alpaslan; Harney, Eadaoin; Stewardson, Kristin; Fernandes, Daniel; Novak, Mario; et al. (2015). "Genome-wide patterns of selection in 230 ancient Eurasians". Nature. 528 (7583): 499–503. Bibcode:2015Natur.528..499M. doi:10.1038/nature16152. ISSN 1476-4687. PMC 4918750. PMID 26595274.
- Mathieson, Iain; et al. (February 21, 2018). "The Genomic History of Southeastern Europe". Nature. 555 (7695). Nature Research: 197–203. Bibcode:2018Natur.555..197M. doi:10.1038/nature25778. PMC 6091220. PMID 29466330.
- Narasimhan, Vagheesh M.; Patterson, Nick; Moorjani, Priya; Rohland, Nadin; Bernardos, Rebecca (September 6, 2019). "The formation of human populations in South and Central Asia". Science. 365 (6457) eaat7487. American Association for the Advancement of Science. Bibcode:2019Sci...365t7487N. bioRxiv 10.1101/292581. doi:10.1126/science.aat7487. ISSN 0036-8075. PMC 6822619. PMID 31488661.
- Olalde, Iñigo (February 21, 2018). "The Beaker phenomenon and the genomic transformation of northwest Europe". Nature. 555 (7695). Nature Research: 190–196. Bibcode:2018Natur.555..190O. doi:10.1038/nature25738. PMC 5973796. PMID 29466337.
- Olalde, Iñigo (March 15, 2019). "The genomic history of the Iberian Peninsula over the past 8000 years". Science. 363 (6432). American Association for the Advancement of Science: 1230–1234. Bibcode:2019Sci...363.1230O. doi:10.1126/science.aav4040. PMC 6436108. PMID 30872528.
- Papac, Luka; Ernée, Michal; Dobeš, Miroslav; Langová, Michaela; Rohrlach, Adam B.; Aron, Franziska; Neumann, Gunnar U.; Spyrou, Maria A.; Rohland, Nadin; Velemínský, Petr; Kuna, Martin (August 27, 2021). "Dynamic changes in genomic and social structures in third millennium BCE central Europe". Science Advances. 7 (35) eabi6941. Bibcode:2021SciA....7.6941P. doi:10.1126/sciadv.abi6941. ISSN 2375-2548. PMC 8386934. PMID 34433570.
- Rasmussen, Simon; Allentoft, Morten Erik; Nielsen, Kasper; Orlando, Ludovic; Sikora, Martin; Sjögren, Karl-Göran; Pedersen, Anders Gorm; Schubert, Mikkel; Van Dam, Alex; Kapel, Christian Moliin Outzen; et al. (October 22, 2015). "Early Divergent Strains of Yersinia pestis in Eurasia 5,000 Years Ago". Cell. 163 (3): 571–582. doi:10.1016/j.cell.2015.10.009. ISSN 0092-8674. PMC 4644222. PMID 26496604.
- Reich, David (2018). Who We are and How We Got Here: Ancient DNA and the New Science of the Human Past. Oxford University Press. ISBN 978-0-19-882125-0.
- Reich, David; Thangaraj, Kumarasamy; Patterson, Nick; Price, Alkes L.; Singh, Lalji (2009), "Reconstructing Indian population history", Nature, 461 (7263): 489–494, Bibcode:2009Natur.461..489R, doi:10.1038/nature08365, ISSN 0028-0836, PMC 2842210, PMID 19779445
- Skoglund, Pontus; Mathieson, Iain (August 31, 2018). "Ancient Genomics of Modern Humans: The First Decade". Annual Review of Genomics and Human Genetics. 19 (1): 381–404. doi:10.1146/annurev-genom-083117-021749. ISSN 1527-8204. PMID 29709204. S2CID 19933330.
- Wang, Chuan-Chao; Reinhold, Sabine; Kalmykov, Alexey; Wissgott, Antje; Brandt, Guido; Jeong, Choongwon; Cheronet, Olivia; Ferry, Matthew; Harney, Eadaoin; Keating, Denise; et al. (February 4, 2019). "Ancient human genome-wide data from a 3000-year interval in the Caucasus corresponds with eco-geographic regions". Nature Communications. 10 (1). Nature Research. 590. Bibcode:2019NatCo..10..590W. doi:10.1038/s41467-018-08220-8. ISSN 2041-1723. PMC 6360191. PMID 30713341.
