= Pınarbaşı Gölü =

Archaeological site in Turkey

Coordinates: 37.4939°N 33.0192°E

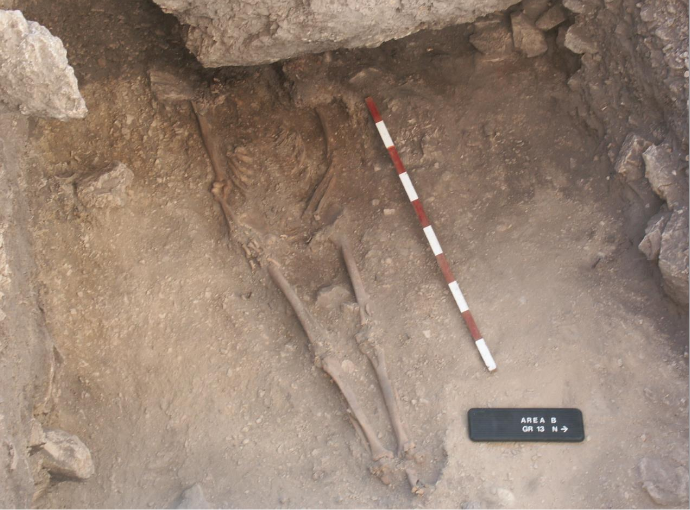

Pınarbaşı Gölü is an archaeological site in Turkey containing objects from the Epipaleolithic period. It is located in Konya Province, Central Anatolia.

Spearheads have been found here as well as blanks for a hooked tang dagger and flat axes. The objects are not securely datable.

== Ancient domestic dog ==
In 2026 the buried remains of juvenile canids found at the site were identified as early domestic dogs dating to between 15,915 BP to 15,669 BP. The post mortem remains of the dogs had been treated in a similar way to those of human burials.
