= Iranian hunter-gatherers =

Mesolithic hunter-gatherers of Iranian Plateau

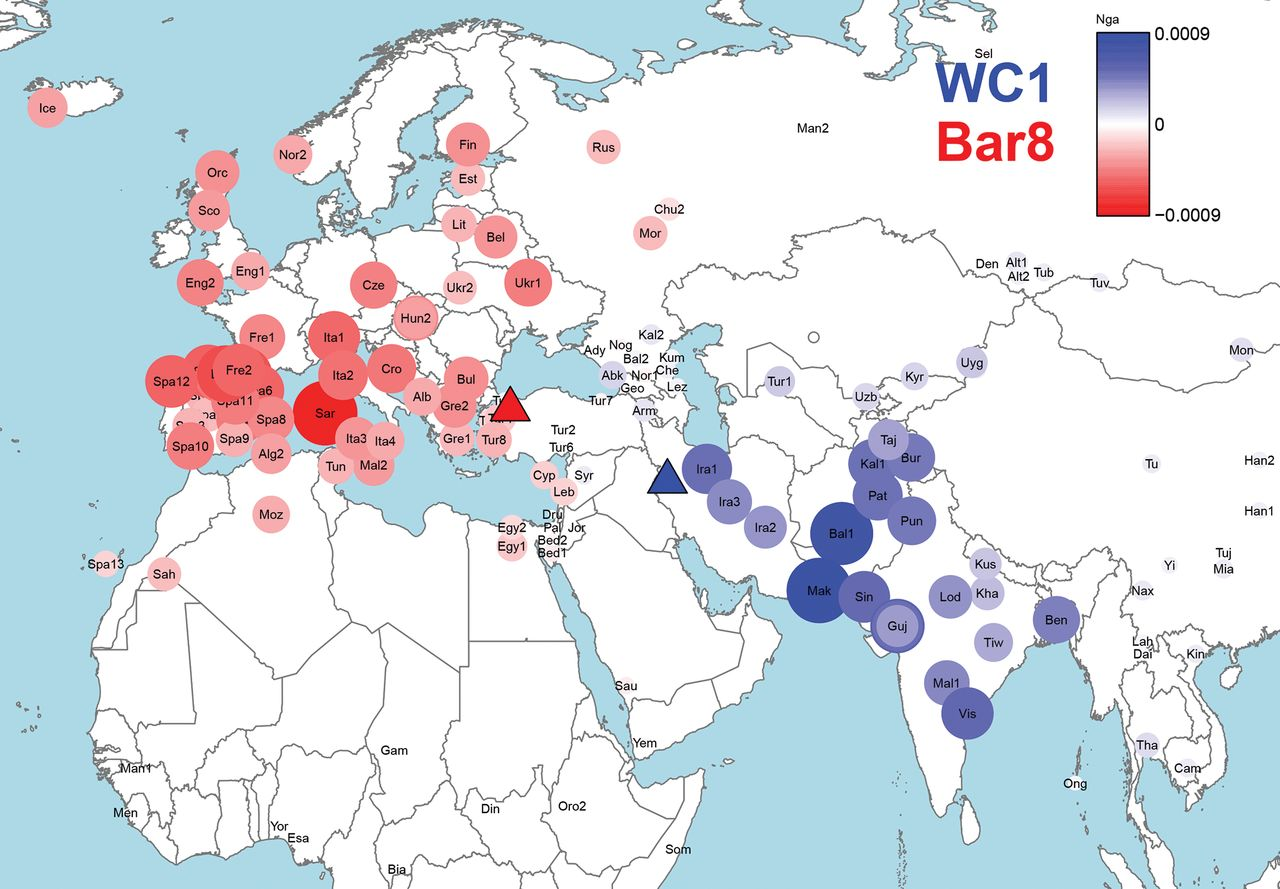
Modern-day groups with a genetic affinity to Iranian Neolithic Wezmeh Cave genome ( Blue triangle) compared to the Anatolian Neolithic Barcın genome ( Red triangle), are depicted with an increasingly stronger blue or red color, respectively.

The term Iranian hunter-gatherers (IHG), is used to refer to a population genomics lineage representing the Mesolithic to early Neolithic population of the Iranian plateau, South Asia, South-Central Asia and the Caucasus.

The Iranian hunter-gatherer lineage is represented by Mesolithic hunter-gatherers and later by Neolithic herders and early farmers in present-day Iran, such as remains excavated from the Hotu and Kamarband Caves and Ganj Dareh, Tepe Abdul Hosein, as well as Wezmeh. A deeply diverged sister branch (at least 12,000 years BP), best represented by remains from Shahr-i-Sokhta BA2 individuals from Indus Periphery cline, formed the dominant ancestry component of the Indus Valley Civilisation in Northwestern India, which was mixed with a local East Eurasian component termed Ancient Ancestral South Indian (AASI). Later analyses detect an Anatolian farmer related signal in some of the Indus Periphery samples, likely mediated through early Neolithic or Copper Age Central Asian groups such as Sarazm and Namazga. This indicates that part of the Iran_N related ancestry in the Indus Periphery group was accompanied by Anatolian farmer input from West Asia with the spread of farming, rather than being exclusively pre-agricultural Iranian hunter-gatherer related. The Iranian hunter-gatherers also represent an important source for the formation of the Central Asian gene pool, primarily via the Bactria–Margiana Archaeological Complex. They further displayed close genetic affinities to the Caucasus hunter-gatherers, who descend primarily from a similar source population as Iranian hunter-gatherers, but were distinct from preceding Paleolithic Caucasus populations, which were closer related to Anatolian hunter-gatherers, Western hunter-gatherers and Levantine groups.

== Origins ==
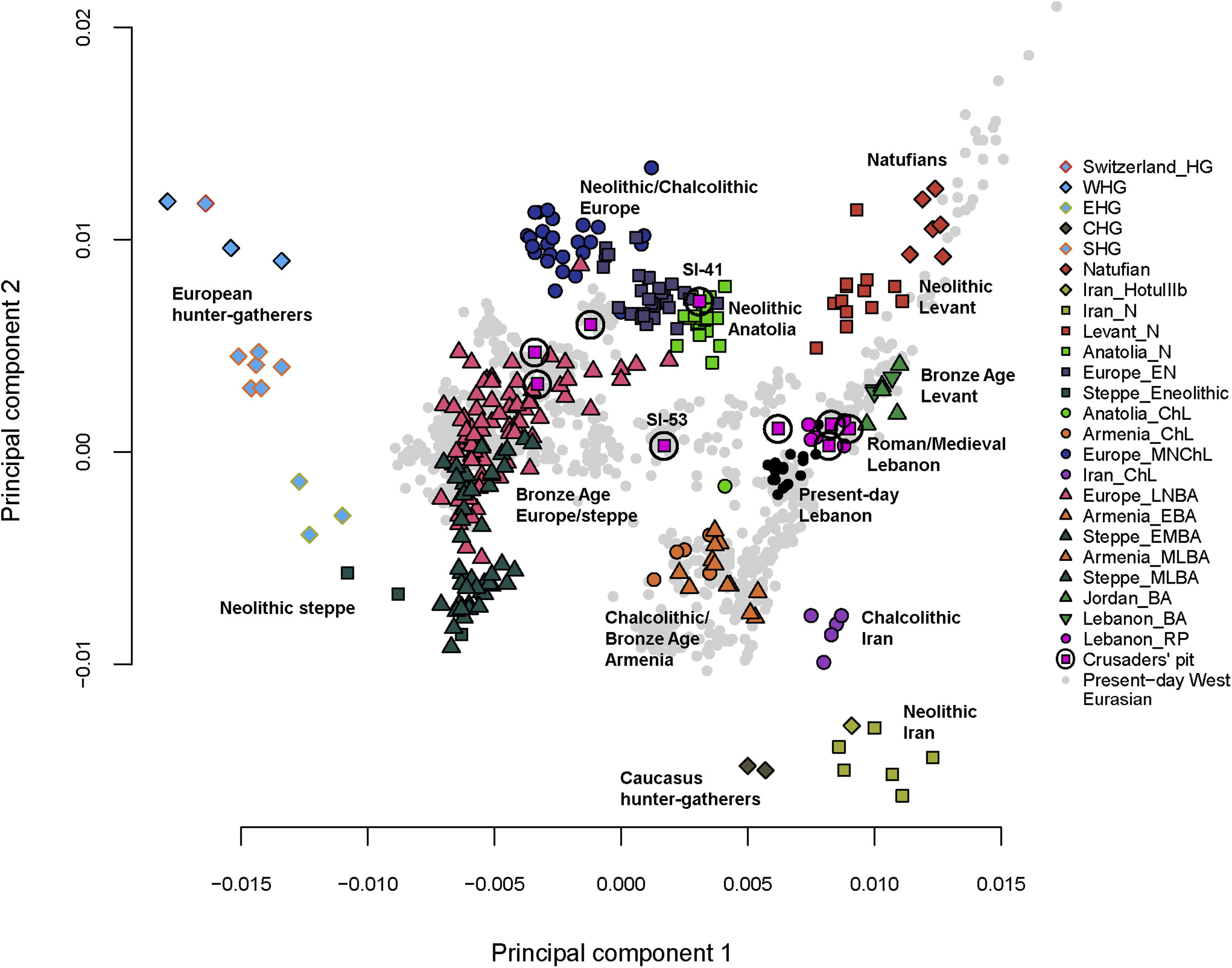
Principal components analysis of ancient West Eurasians. Eigenvectors were inferred using present-day populations (gray points) and the ancient samples (colored shapes) were projected onto the plot.

Neolithic Iranian sample GD13a from Ganj Dareh ( black triangle) placed on a PCA plot among ancient and modern Western Eurasian samples.

Iranian hunter-gatherers are inferred to have originated from the local Upper Paleolithic population of the Iranian plateau. The Iranian plateau acted as population hub during the initial colonisation of Eurasia after the Out-of-Africa expansion of modern humans (between 70–46kya). The region is also close to the area which may have harbored the Basal Eurasian lineage, which is supposed to have been centered in the now sunken Persian Gulf, and which displayed no or significantly reduced archaic admixture.

While Iranian hunter-gatherers are broadly placed as part of the wider "West Eurasian" cluster, the exact origin of the Mesolithic and Neolithic Iranian hunter-gatherers and later farmers remains unclear. Mesolithic hunter-gatherer remains from the Alborz mountain range were found to show ancestry primarily related to Basal Eurasians (c. 48–66%), and are ancestral to later Neolithic herders and farmers.

The later Neolithic Iranians are commonly modeled as two-way admixture between a Basal Eurasian-rich lineage and a lineage closer to Ancient North Eurasians (ANE) or Eastern European Hunter-Gatherers (EHG). Accordingly, the Mesolithic/Neolithic Iranian lineage derives the majority of their ancestry from a local Basal-rich source (ranging from 48–68%), with the remainder ancestry being closer to Ancient North Eurasians (32–52%).

Mesolithic and Neolithic Iranians fall along a cline between inferred Basal Eurasian and ANE/EHG-related ancestries. This stands in contrast to Neolithic Anatolian and Levant groups, who fall along a cline between Basal Eurasian and WHG-related ancestries. Natufians, despite sharing most of their ancestry with Neolithic Anatolian groups, have an additional "Ancient North African" (ANA) ancestry component. This distinction is also evident in that Iranian hunter-gatherers and Neolithic Iranian groups are taking up an "extreme position" compared against other ancient and modern West Eurasian populations within an Eurasian-wide Principal component analysis (PCA).

The f4-ratio estimation for the total amount of Basal Eurasian ancestry stands in correlation with the reduced archaic allele sharing among Iranian hunter-gatherers and later herders or early farmers. Yet alternative explanations, such as purifying selection, may affect the amount of archaic alleles independently from Basal Eurasian admixture.

Alternatively, Neolithic Iranians can also be modeled via either a three-way admixture, including a primarily (c. 53%) Upper Paleolithic Caucasus/Dzudzuana-like source (itself an admixture between c. 24–28% Basal Eurasian and c. 72–76% Upper Paleolithic European ancestry; and close to later Anatolian hunter-gatherers), and variable amounts of geneflow from an ANE-like source (21%), and an additional Basal Eurasian source (26%); or a four-way admixture with approximately 53–62% Upper Paleolithic Caucasus/Dzudzuana-like ancestry, 16–22% ANE-like ancestry, 10–13% Onge-like ancestry, and 9–15% additional Basal Eurasian-like ancestry.

Vallini et al. (2024) argued that Mesolithic/Neolithic Iranians carry in part a deeply diverged West Eurasian ancestry (WEC2) which stayed closer to the inferred population hub on the Persian plateau than compared to Upper Paleolithic Europeans (WEC or Kostenki-14). This deeply diverged West Eurasian component, after contact events with nearby populations, including Basal and East Eurasian ancestries, resurfaced in the palaeogenetic record as the Iranian Neolithic, the Iranian Hunter-Gatherer' or the "East Meta". A qpAdm model by Vallini et al. 2024, including the simulated proxies for the WEC/WEC2 as well as Basal/BEA components (Gumuz as proxy for BEA), the genetic makeup of Neolithic Iranians (Ganj_Dareh_N) consists of c. 76.5% West Eurasian (WEC/WEC2), c. 16.3% broadly East Eurasian (EEC), and c. 7.2% "Basal-like" (BEA/Gumuz) ancestries.

While initially absent from Anatolia, Mesopotamia and the Caucasus, as well as India, it reached these regions via the expansion of Mesolithic and Neolithic groups, resulting in a cline between Iran Neolithic-like and local sources.

=== Uniparental haplogroups ===
The main human Y-chromosome DNA haplogroups found among Mesolithic and Neolithic Iranian-affiliated specimens include subclades of J, G, and R2, while subclades of L are observed among early divergent 'IVC periphery' like remains. Others included subclades of T. The oldest sample of haplogroup R2a to date has been found in one of the remains from Ganj Dareh in western Iran. Common Human mitochondrial DNA haplogroups found among Mesolithic and Neolithic Iranian specimens include subclades of haplogroup U, HV, X, R, H, W, T, and M.

== Contributions to other populations ==
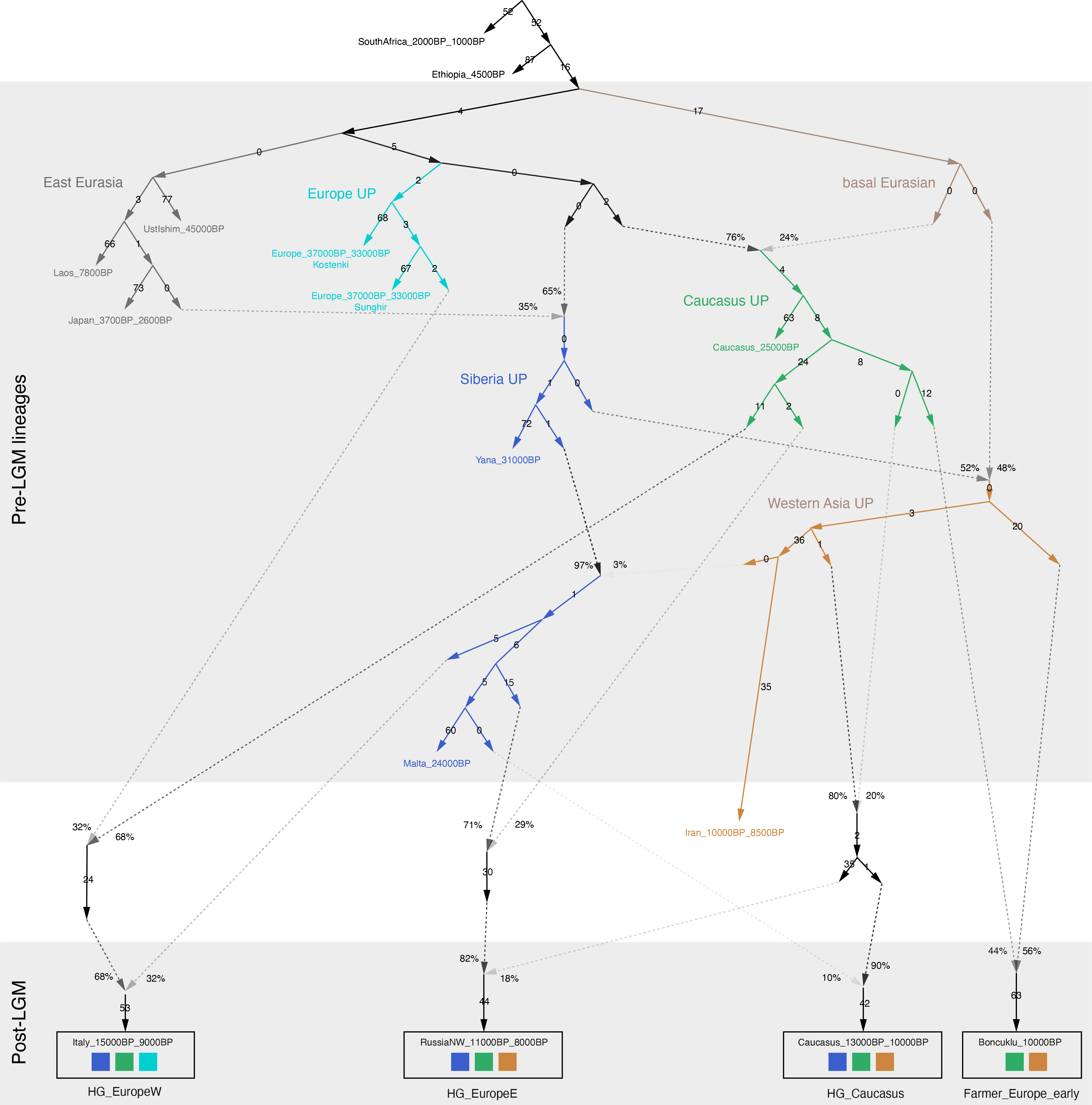
One possible admixture graph (Allentoft et al. 2024) of deep Eurasian lineages in context of modern West Eurasians.

=== Caucasus (Upper Paleolithic to Mesolithic) ===
Caucasus hunter-gatherers were found to be distinct from the earlier Upper Paleolithic Caucasus/Dzudzuana population, but closely related to the Mesolithic and Neolithic Iranians. They are inferred to descend primarily from the same source population, which reached the Caucasus region sometimes between 13,000 to 25,000 years ago, during the Last Glacial Maximum or the beginning of the Bølling–Allerød Interstadial. They can be used as interchangeable source for Holocene populations, with various names have been created to group them together, such as Iran_N/CHG, Iran/Caucasus or Zagros/Caucasus ancestry. The CHG can be modeled as merger between an Iranian hunter-gatherer related source (c. 72%), an UP Caucasus (Dzudzuana) related source (c. 18%), and an Eastern hunter-gatherer related source (c. 10%). An alternative model suggests c. 72% from an Iranian hunter-gatherer source, c. 21% from an EHG-like source, and c. 7% from a WHG-like source.

=== Upper Mesopotamia and the South Caucasus ===
During the Early Holocene (9700–6200 BCE), genetic modelling cannot reliably distinguish Iran_N from CHG. Based on archaeological syntheses, the Iran_N gene pool spread westward from the northwest Zagros into Upper Mesopotamia and then into Central Anatolia, whereas contacts between the South Caucasus and the northern Fertile Crescent were only occasional in this interval.

Chataigner documents a clear east–west gradient in Iran_N proportions across the northern Fertile Crescent, with highest levels in the northwest Zagros (Shanidar, Bestansur at 75-80%), intermediate levels in the Upper/Middle Tigris (Nemrik 9, Boncuklu Tarla at 50-70%), and lower levels toward the Upper Tigris (Cayonu at 33%), the Middle Euphrates (Nevalı Çori at 15%), and Central Anatolia (between 0% to up to 30%), with negligible amounts in Western Anatolia and the Levant.

The westward diffusion is argued to have proceeded via small, mobile groups—including specialised craftsmen—moving from the northwest Zagros through Upper Mesopotamia toward the Taurus and Central Anatolia. By mid–Early Holocene, this Iran_N gene pool is variably present from the Zagros to Central Anatolia while peripheral regions remain less affected.

In the South Caucasus, markers of Neolithic lifeways—highly domesticated plants and animals, pressure-flaking with a lever, and pottery—appear later (6200–5200 BCE) and are attributed to arrivals from Upper Mesopotamia. Genetic data indicate admixture without wholesale replacement of local Mesolithic groups. Iran_N/CHG ancestry is ~61.7% at Aknashen, ~37.6% at Masis Blur, ~55.1% at Polutepe, and ~30.0%/~48.1% at Mentesh Tepe—Aknashen highest, Masis lowest, Polutepe and Mentesh intermediate. Iran_N moved out of the northwest Zagros into Upper Mesopotamia and only later reached the South Caucasus, where domesticated plants and animals, pressure-lever blade technology, and pottery appear with these arrivals. The Iranian-related ancestry among Aknashen can be modeled by geneflow from the CHG cluster specifically, while models with Iran_N (GanjDareh_N) are rejected; in turn, Masis Blur and Mentesh Tepe can be successfully modeled with geneflow from Aknashen and a Levantine/Anatolian source. Subsequent modelling by Ghalichi et al. (2024) places the South Caucasus Neolithic populations on a common cline between Caucasus hunter-gatherer (CHG) ancestry and an Upper Mesopotamian source. Armenia_Aknashen_N, Armenia_MasisBlur_N and Azerbaijan_LN are modelled with the Pre-Pottery Neolithic population of Çayönü as the second source: Aknashen returns roughly 34% CHG and 66% Çayönü_N, Masis Blur roughly 22% CHG and 78% Çayönü_N, and Azerbaijan_LN roughly 29% CHG and 71% Çayönü_N. Georgia_Neolithic is modelled as roughly 43% CHG and 57% Çatalhöyük_N (Central Anatolian Pottery Neolithic). Aknashen and Georgia_Neolithic sit at the CHG-rich end of the cline, while Masis Blur and Azerbaijan_LN sit toward the Çayönü-rich end. The Çayönü-rooted Armenian and Azerbaijani branch of the cline routes the South Caucasus Neolithic signal through a Pre-Pottery Neolithic population that is itself substantially Iran_N-derived. Altınışık et al. (2022) report that "Çayönü bears mainly Anatolian ancestry, complemented by 33% of Zagros and 19% of Southern Levant ancestries," with ancestry proportions modelled as a three-way admixture of Central Anatolia (EP Pınarbaşı), South Levant and Central Zagros-related sources, placing Çayönü on a Mesopotamian–Anatolian cline that traces back to the same northwest Zagros source from which Iran_N spreads. The Çayönü-rooted modelling in Ghalichi et al. (2024) therefore preserves the Iran_N origin emphasised by Chataigner while resolving the apparent tension with Lazaridis et al. (2022)'s qpAdm test, which found that the high-CHG Aknashen individual rejects Ganj Dareh (Iran_N) as a direct source even though most other Neolithic populations of the region accept either CHG or Ganj Dareh as the southern source. Iran_N reaches Aknashen, Masis Blur and Azerbaijan_LN indirectly, through Çayönü-derived Upper Mesopotamian Pre-Pottery Neolithic farmers admixing with resident CHG along the Çayönü–Caucasus Neolithic gradient, rather than as a direct Ganj Dareh contribution. Georgia_Neolithic, where Upper Mesopotamian PPN sources are rejected, is instead modelled through the related Çatalhöyük_N Anatolian Neolithic source.

=== North Caucasus and Lower Volga steppes ===
Zhur et al. show that the Nalchik Eneolithic genome is genetically closer to earlier Pre-Pottery/Neolithic groups of Northern Mesopotamia and the Zagros, than to the sixth-millennium South Caucasus Neolithic (Shulaveri–Shomu–Aratashen). Through recent IBD sharing and close fits they link Nalchik in the North Caucasus to Khvalynsk on the Lower Volga Steppes and argue that in the first half of the 5th millennium BCE people carrying this Zagros (Iran_N–like) ancestry moved north across the Caucasus, bringing herding and farming into the Don–Volga steppes.

The study outlines cultural ties along this corridor: Late Chalcolithic (LC1) comb-stamped ware known in the Araxes valley (Ovçular Tepesi) and the Upper Euphrates (Norşuntepe) also appears at Meshoko and Myskhako in the North Caucasus. Sioni-type pottery (Zamok, Vorontsovskaya peschera, and Mentesh Tepe) links Southern and Northern Caucasus sites, and Areni-1 shows genetic similarity to Nalchik, with an EHG signal that marks two-way gene flow between South and North Caucasus.

Dating of the emergence of a Trans-Caucasus route that transferred "producing economy" skills (farming/herding) is no later than early 5th millennium BCE, and the Northern Caucasus was belatedly Neolithized in the first half of that millennium, followed by Neolithization of the adjacent steppe to the Lower Volga in the Eneolithic. They describe genetic heterogeneity at Khvalynsk (EHG with CHG/Iran_N/farmer ancestry), consider the chance of earlier CHG inputs into the steppe, and treat Nalchik/Darkveti-Meshoko as at least a second southern-derived wave.

Later Chaff-Faced Ware horizons lead into Maykop culture. Ghalichi et al. modeled the Maykop-associated cluster (Maykop, Late Maykop, and Maykop–Novosvobodnaya culture) as requiring a substantial contribution from northwest Iranian Chalcolithic farmers of the Hajji Firuz type, in addition to ancestry from local Caucasus Eneolithic groups and southern Caucasus farmers. In their preferred models, Maykop–Novosvobodnaya carries about 42% ancestry related to Hajji Firuz Chalcolithic Iran, with the remainder mainly from Caucasus Eneolithic and a smaller share from southern Caucasus Chalcolithic farming groups, while the Maykop main cluster carries about 28% Hajji Firuz–related ancestry. Late Maykop is modeled as derived entirely from earlier Maykop and therefore inherits this northwest Iranian Chalcolithic component, which thus forms a significant minority of the ancestry in Maykop populations. Subsequent successions (e.g., Dolmen, Northern Caucasus culture) shaped later steppe interactions more than Maykop itself.

=== Core Yamnaya and CLV cline ===
Recent work on the origins of Yamnaya steppe herders has identified a Caucasus–Lower Volga (CLV) cline that links Neolithic and Chalcolithic populations of the southern Caucasus with Eneolithic groups on the Lower Volga. The CLV cline runs from Neolithic farmers at Aknashen in Armenia through Maykop and Remontnoye in the North Caucasus to the Berezhnovka-2–Progress-2 cluster ("BPgroup") on the Lower Volga. The "core Yamnaya" population is modeled as deriving around four fifths of its ancestry from CLV-cline groups with Lower Volga ancestry, with the remaining share coming from local hunter-gatherers of the Dnipro–Don region carrying Ukraine Neolithic hunter-gatherer (UNHG) ancestry.

The southern end of the cline, represented by Aknashen, carries a large share of inland "Zagros–Caucasus" ancestry closely related to Caucasus hunter-gatherers (CHG) and Iranian Neolithic groups from the Zagros, together with additional Anatolia and Levant-related ancestry. In this unified three-way (CHG/Iran_N, Anatolian, Levantine) model of Neolithic West Asia, Aknashen and related South Caucasus Neolithic populations sit at the CHG and Ganj Dareh–rich pole of an inland continuum that also includes Iran_N-rich Pre-Pottery Neolithic farmers of Upper Mesopotamia grouped as Mesopotamia_PPN, represented by Boncuklu Tarla near Mardin in southeastern Turkey and Nemrik 9 in northern Iraq. This continuum runs from Mesopotamia_PPN at the more Iran_N-rich end to Aknashen at the CHG and Iran_N–rich end, showing that South Caucasus Neolithic communities blended local CHG-like ancestry with the incoming ancestry ultimately traceable to Iran_N-rich farmers of Upper Mesopotamia and the Zagros.

Further north, Maykop individuals form a tight cluster on the CLV cline and require contribution from northwest Iranian Chalcolithic farmers of the Hajji Firuz type, in addition to ancestry from Caucasus Eneolithic and South Caucasus Chalcolithic farming groups. In preferred models, the Maykop main cluster carries about 28% Hajji Firuz–related ancestry, while Maykop–Novosvobodnaya carries about 42%, establishing a direct link between Zagros-derived Iran Neolithic lineages and the North Caucasus. In an alternative modeling framework, the Maykop main cluster is instead successfully fitted as deriving roughly 86% of its ancestry from Aknashen-like Neolithic farmers of the South Caucasus and about 14% from BPgroup on the Lower Volga, showing that most of its "southern" component can be captured with Aknashen-related ancestry, with only a modest contribution from Lower Volga steppe groups.

At the Lower Volga end of the cline, BPgroup and the Volga cline populations (Khvalynsk-related groups such as Khi, Kmed, Khlopkov Bugor and PVgroup) form a tightly interconnected structure. Two-way models fit BPgroup as mixtures of Khvalynsk-related groups from the north and more CHG/CLV-enriched groups from the south: one successful solution uses Khi at about 32% and PVgroup at about 68%, while another replaces Khi with Khlopkov Bugor at roughly 29% and PVgroup at 71%. Zhur et al. approach the same problem from the Darkveti-Meshoko / Nalchik side. In their three-way qpAdm models with Iran_HotuIIIb (CHG-like), EHG and various Upper Mesopotamian / Anatolian PPN sources, the Nalchik man takes a substantial farmer component: best-fitting models with Asikli Höyük PPN give roughly 42-44% ancestry, 54-56% Iran_HotuIIIb and 2-3% EHG. Asikli Höyük PPN can be modeled with 31% Zagros/Caucasus_Mesolithic and rest with Anatolia Epipaleolithic ancestry. When the same framework is applied to Khvalynsk, Zhur fix EHG and Iran_HotuIIIb and let the third source vary over farmer groups. They find a strong gradient within Khvalynsk itself, with I0434 ("Khi" in Lazaridis et al.) reaching max 68% Upper Mesopotamian / Anatolian PPN, 8% EHG and 24% Iran_HotuIIIb ancestry, whereas I0122 has 25% Upper Mesopotamian / Anatolian PPN, 28% EHG and 47% Iran_HotuIIIb ancestry. IBD analysis then shows that Khvalynsk I0434 shares long haplotype blocks with Nalchik man, consistent with recent gene flow from a Nalchik/Unakozovo-like Darkveti-Meshoko population into this "Khi" subset of Khvalynsk. Taken together, Lazaridis et al. treat BPgroup and the Volga cline as mixtures of a CHG-rich CLV ancestry and an EHG-rich upriver ancestry at the Lower Volga, while Zhur et al. refine the "southern" side of that story: they argue that part of the Khvalynsk "Khi" component is specifically an Upper Mesopotamian PPN-derived farmer/herder ancestry, routed through Darkveti-Meshoko/Nalchik, carrying crops, herding practices and related material culture north into the Lower Volga steppe.

Remontnoye Eneolithic individuals occupy an intermediate position between BPgroup and Caucasus Neolithic farmers. They can be modeled as an approximately even mixture of BPgroup ancestry and an Armenian or Caucasus Neolithic source closely related to Aknashen or early Maykop.

The CLV cline forms a north–south gradient in which inland Zagros/Iran Neolithic ancestry—carried by Upper Mesopotamian farmers—is combined with local Mesolithic CHG ancestry maximized in Aknashen and related South Caucasus Neolithic groups, and with EHG-rich steppe ancestry on the Lower Volga. Through this cline, Iranian hunter-gatherer–derived and Iran_N-like ancestry contributed indirectly but substantially to the formation of the Yamnaya gene pool and to later Indo-European-speaking populations.

=== West Asia ===
The later Chalcolithic Iranians are modeled to have formed from a merger of local Neolithic Iranians and a Neolithic Levantine-like source population, as well as additional Caucasus hunter-gatherer-like geneflow. Chalcolithic Iranians can be modeled to derive c. 80% of their ancestry from a Neolithic Iranian-like group and c. 20% from a Neolithic Levantine-like group (which itself carried Neolithic Anatolian and Natufian components). Alternatively, they can be modeled as two-way admixture between c. 87% CHG-like and 13% Neolithic Levantine-like, or as three-way admixture between c. 17% Iranian hunter-gatherers, 63% CHG-like, and 20% Neolithic Levantine-like.

During the Late Neolithic/Early Chalcolithic period they formed a cline stretching from Western Anatolia along the lowlands of the Southern Caucasus to the Zagros mountains, reaching as far as to Southern Central Asia, as well as southwards to the Southern Levant. This cline was primarily characterized by expansive Anatolian and Iranian-like ancestries and secondarily by the spread of Levantine-like ancestry. Chalcolithic Iranian groups had a wide impact on Chalcolithic Anatolians and Bronze Age Levantine groups, contributing 33% and 44% ancestry respectively.

A Neolithic Iranian-like contribution is needed in models for modern Middle Eastern and certain Eastern African populations. This geneflow may have happened primarily via an admixed population from the Mesopotamia.

Neolithic Iranians represent a better source of geneflow among most West Asian populations when compared against Caucasus hunter-gatherers.

=== Ancient Egypt ===
Genome analysis of Old Kingdom individual (NUE001), adult male, excavated at Nuwayrat showed that his ancestry is best explained by a two-source model in which 77.6% derives from Neolithic North African farmers closely related to individuals from the Middle Neolithic site of Skhirat-Rouazi in Morocco, and 22.4% from a "Mesopotamia Neolithic" cluster from Upper Mesopotamia (roughly 50–70 % Iran_N). The Nuwayrat genome links Early Dynastic Egypt to both earlier North African Neolithic groups and farming populations of the eastern Fertile Crescent. These genetic findings are consistent with archaeological evidence for early connections between Egypt and Mesopotamia, including the spread of domesticated plants and animals, writing traditions and technologies such as the potter's wheel, but the authors emphasise that a single high-status burial cannot be assumed to represent the whole Old Kingdom population.

=== South Asia ===
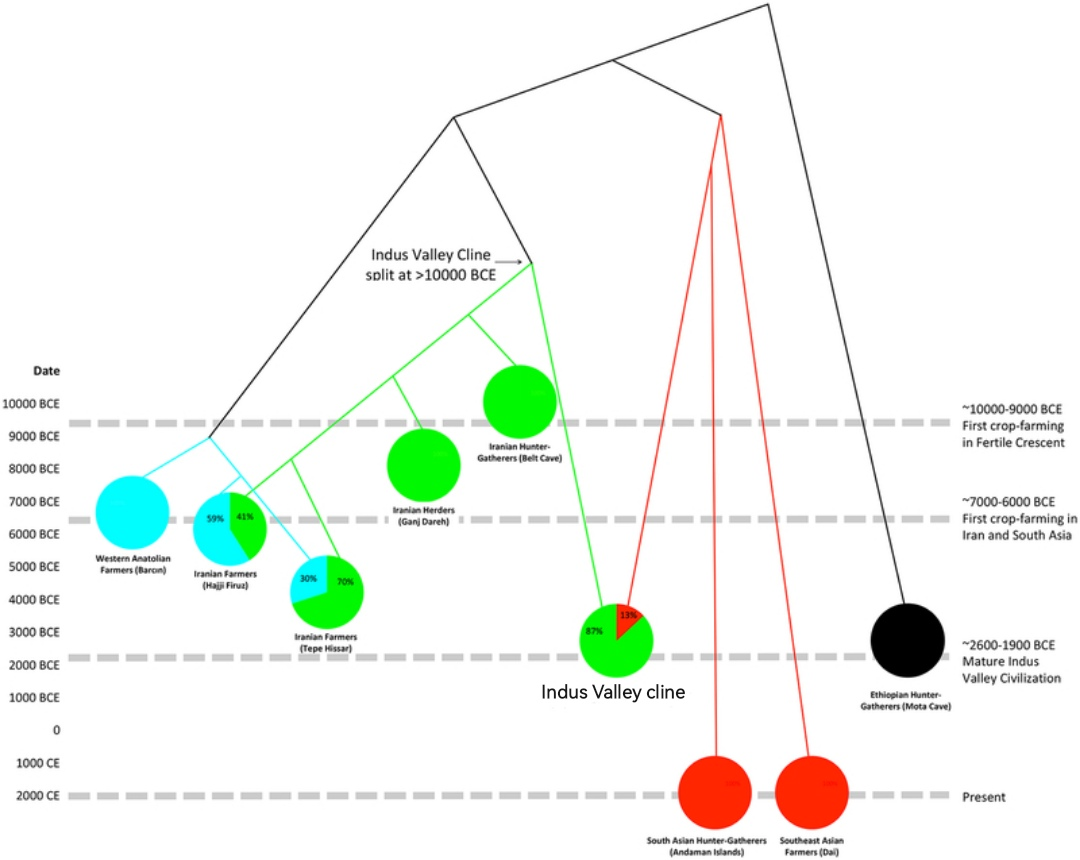
An Ancient Harappan Genome

In 2019, the genome of skeletal remains from a cemetery near Rakhigarhi, dated to around 2,800–2,300 BCE, was sequenced, suggesting that the majority of the ancestry was related to Iranian hunter-gatherers. The divergent sister lineage (at least 12,000 years BP), sharing a recent common ancestor with Neolithic Iranians, but having diverged from them prior to the development of agriculture, best represented by remains from Shahr-i-Sokhta BA2 individuals from the Indus-Periphery cline, forms the main ancestry component of the Indus Valley Civilisation, in tandem with variable amounts of a proposed local East Eurasian ancestry termed Ancient Ancestral South Indian (AASI). Subsequent large-scale analyses refine this by showing that part of this Iranian-related ancestry is better modeled via early Neolithic and Copper Age Central Asian groups such as Sarazm and Namazga, which themselves carry a modest Anatolian farmer–related component (around one tenth to one fifth of the ancestry in the case of Sarazm) and consistent with models that allow contributions from lineages like Hajji Firuz/Tepe Hissar. Thus, Iran_N related ancestry in the Indus Periphery group was accompanied by Anatolian farmer input from West Asia with the spread of farming and need not be exclusively "pre-agricultural Iran-related". The spread of Ancient Iranian-like ancestry, and or IVC-like ancestry, may be related to the dispersal of early Dravidian languages, although this remains uncertain, with opposing views having been presented as well, with some scholars connecting this ancestry with the spread of Indo-Aryan languages.

=== Central Asia ===
Neolithic Iranians, in tandem with Anatolian Farmers, also contributed to the formation of the Bactria–Margiana Archaeological Complex (BMAC), which subsequently contributed to other Central Asian populations, and possibly later Tarim mummies from Alwighul (700–1 BCE) and Krorän (200 CE). The BMAC population is inferred to have formed primarily from Iran_N (60–65%) and Anatolia_N (20–25%) ancestries, with the remainder (~10%) being derived from a West Siberian HG-like source (WSHG).

=== Europe ===
Based on the genome of individual GD13a, the inhabitants of Ganj Dareh probably made little direct genetic contribution to modern European populations, suggesting they were somewhat more isolated from Europe compared to populations of the Fertile Crescent.

There are clear indications of a gene flow of Iranian Neolithic ancestry to several early Bronze Age Mediterranean populations which cannot be modeled solely via Steppe ancestry; e.g., the Minoan population of Crete carried Iranian Neolithic-like ancestry but no Steppe-related ancestry. The genomes of several Bronze Age populations from Sicily, Sardinia, and the Iberian Peninsula as well as some Mycenaean populations could not be adequately modeled with just Steppe-ancestry, but could be successfully modeled with a direct Iranian Neolithic contribution.

=== Imperial Rome ===
Genetic time-series from central Italy show that Iron Age and early Republican populations had little Iran_N/CHG ancestry, but this component rises sharply from about the 4th–2nd centuries BCE onward. In qpAdm models that decompose ancestry into Serbia_Mesolithic, Anatolia_N, Steppe_BA and Iran_N, the Iran_N share stays low in most Iron Age–Republican individuals (average 11%) and then increases in samples dated from the late Republic into the Imperial period (Imperial average 31%), largely at the expense of Steppe_BA and Mesolithic components while Anatolia_N remains relatively stable. Admixture dates estimated with DATES place the main pulse of gene flow from an eastern source between the 4th and 2nd centuries BCE, showing that Near Eastern, Iran_N/CHG-rich ancestry began entering the Roman gene pool before the formal start of the Empire.

By the Imperial period this eastern input, carried by migrants from the eastern Mediterranean and Near East, had transformed the genetic profile of Rome. Additionally, In two-way models, Imperial Romans are fitted as mixtures of local Iron Age or Republican Italians or Etruscans and Iron Age or late Republican individuals already enriched in eastern Mediterranean ancestry, such as the Villa Falgari late Republican outlier, the Levant-shifted Tarquinia Monterozzi Iron Age individuals, and eastern-shifted Etruscans from Grosseto in Tuscany. In several of these models the eastern-shifted source contributes a majority of the ancestry, with estimated proportions ranging from about 56% to 84% (for example 80.4% and 78.1% from Villa Falgari, 68.5–70.1% from Tarquinia Monterozzi, and 83.8% from eastern-shifted Grosseto Etruscans), and these sources are already Iran_N/CHG-rich, supporting the view that Iran_N-rich Near Eastern ancestry became one of the dominant components of the Imperial Roman gene pool.

== See also ==
- History of Iran
- Peopling of India
- Genetics and archaeogenetics of South Asia
- Genetic history of the Middle East
