= Nature Ecology & Evolution =

Online-only scientific journal

- Cover of Volume 5 Issue 9 from September 2021
- Discipline: Ecology
- Language: English
- Edited by: Simon Harold

Publication details
- History: 2017–present
- Publisher: Nature Portfolio
- Frequency: Monthly
- Open access: Hybrid
- Impact factor: 14.2 (2024)

Standard abbreviations
- ISO 4: Nat. Ecol. Evol.

Indexing
- ISSN: 2397-334X
- LCCN: 2017243086
- OCLC no.: 969358709

Links
- Journal homepage

Nature Ecology & Evolution is an online-only monthly peer-reviewed scientific journal published by Nature Portfolio covering all aspects of research on ecology and evolutionary biology. It was established in 2017. Its first editor-in-chief was Patrick Goymer. The current editor-in-chief is Simon Harold.

According to the Journal Citation Reports, Nature Ecology & Evolution has a 2024 impact factor of 14.2.
