= First European Diplomatic Missions to the Persian Gulf =

The first European diplomatic missions to the Persian Gulf marked the onset of long-standing relationships between Europe and the regions around the Gulf. These missions, beginning in the 16th century, aimed to establish trade routes, political alliances, and religious influence in the strategically vital area.

== Portuguese expeditions ==
The earliest recorded European presence in the Persian Gulf was the Portuguese, spearheaded by explorer Vasco da Gama, who arrived in 1498. Portugal sought to establish control over the sea route to India, necessitating a presence in the Gulf. The Portuguese established a foothold in Hormuz in 1507 and built the Fort of Our Lady of the Conception, effectively setting up the first European diplomatic and military presence in the region.

== British involvement ==
The British, driven by the ambitions of the British East India Company, made significant inroads into the Persian Gulf in the 17th century. The company signed the first of many treaties with local rulers in 1766, ensuring protection of the British trade and political interests in the region.

In 1820, following the General Maritime Treaty, Britain became the leading European power in the region. The treaty, signed with various tribal sheikhs of the Persian Gulf, enforced a truce between the sheikhs and established Britain's role as an influential intermediary, thus paving the way for its political and economic dominance.

== French endeavors ==
The French, although later entrants compared to the Portuguese and British, also sent diplomatic missions to the Persian Gulf. Their first diplomatic mission, led by diplomat Charles François Beautemps-Beaupré, was in 1839. His work helped establish diplomatic relations between France and the Persian Gulf states and opened opportunities for trade and cultural exchanges.

== Impact ==
The early European diplomatic missions to the Persian Gulf significantly influenced the political, economic, and cultural dynamics of the region. These missions played a crucial role in shaping the geopolitical status of the Gulf, bringing about a lasting impact that continued well into the 20th and 21st centuries. The influence of the European powers waned in the 20th century with the discovery of oil and the consequent emergence of the United States as a major player in the region. However, the legacy of the initial European incursions continues to be evident in the region's socio-political dynamics, historical narratives, and even in its architectural landscapes.

== See also ==
- History of the Middle East
- Age of Discovery
